

414001–414100 

|-bgcolor=#d6d6d6
| 414001 ||  || — || March 20, 2007 || Kitt Peak || Spacewatch || — || align=right | 2.9 km || 
|-id=002 bgcolor=#E9E9E9
| 414002 ||  || — || March 26, 2007 || Kitt Peak || Spacewatch || MRX || align=right | 1.0 km || 
|-id=003 bgcolor=#E9E9E9
| 414003 ||  || — || March 26, 2007 || Kitt Peak || Spacewatch || — || align=right | 2.2 km || 
|-id=004 bgcolor=#d6d6d6
| 414004 ||  || — || April 11, 2007 || Kitt Peak || Spacewatch || EOS || align=right | 1.8 km || 
|-id=005 bgcolor=#E9E9E9
| 414005 ||  || — || March 15, 2007 || Kitt Peak || Spacewatch || GAL || align=right | 1.5 km || 
|-id=006 bgcolor=#d6d6d6
| 414006 ||  || — || April 8, 2007 || Kitt Peak || Spacewatch || BRA || align=right | 1.6 km || 
|-id=007 bgcolor=#d6d6d6
| 414007 ||  || — || April 14, 2007 || Kitt Peak || Spacewatch || TIR || align=right | 3.1 km || 
|-id=008 bgcolor=#FA8072
| 414008 ||  || — || April 15, 2007 || Socorro || LINEAR || — || align=right | 1.9 km || 
|-id=009 bgcolor=#d6d6d6
| 414009 ||  || — || April 15, 2007 || Kitt Peak || Spacewatch || — || align=right | 2.7 km || 
|-id=010 bgcolor=#d6d6d6
| 414010 ||  || — || April 14, 2007 || Kitt Peak || Spacewatch || — || align=right | 4.0 km || 
|-id=011 bgcolor=#E9E9E9
| 414011 ||  || — || April 15, 2007 || Catalina || CSS || DOR || align=right | 2.5 km || 
|-id=012 bgcolor=#d6d6d6
| 414012 ||  || — || April 14, 2007 || Mount Lemmon || Mount Lemmon Survey || — || align=right | 2.3 km || 
|-id=013 bgcolor=#d6d6d6
| 414013 ||  || — || April 19, 2007 || Kitt Peak || Spacewatch || — || align=right | 2.3 km || 
|-id=014 bgcolor=#d6d6d6
| 414014 ||  || — || April 19, 2007 || Kitt Peak || Spacewatch || — || align=right | 2.3 km || 
|-id=015 bgcolor=#d6d6d6
| 414015 ||  || — || April 20, 2007 || Kitt Peak || Spacewatch || EMA || align=right | 3.6 km || 
|-id=016 bgcolor=#d6d6d6
| 414016 ||  || — || March 13, 2007 || Mount Lemmon || Mount Lemmon Survey || 615 || align=right | 1.4 km || 
|-id=017 bgcolor=#E9E9E9
| 414017 ||  || — || April 22, 2007 || Mount Lemmon || Mount Lemmon Survey || — || align=right | 2.6 km || 
|-id=018 bgcolor=#d6d6d6
| 414018 ||  || — || April 23, 2007 || Kitt Peak || Spacewatch || — || align=right | 3.5 km || 
|-id=019 bgcolor=#d6d6d6
| 414019 ||  || — || April 22, 2007 || Kitt Peak || Spacewatch || — || align=right | 2.2 km || 
|-id=020 bgcolor=#fefefe
| 414020 ||  || — || April 19, 2007 || Mount Lemmon || Mount Lemmon Survey || — || align=right data-sort-value="0.58" | 580 m || 
|-id=021 bgcolor=#E9E9E9
| 414021 ||  || — || April 22, 2007 || Mount Lemmon || Mount Lemmon Survey || — || align=right | 2.9 km || 
|-id=022 bgcolor=#d6d6d6
| 414022 ||  || — || May 11, 2007 || Mount Lemmon || Mount Lemmon Survey || — || align=right | 4.3 km || 
|-id=023 bgcolor=#d6d6d6
| 414023 ||  || — || May 11, 2007 || Mount Lemmon || Mount Lemmon Survey || — || align=right | 2.8 km || 
|-id=024 bgcolor=#d6d6d6
| 414024 ||  || — || June 9, 2007 || Kitt Peak || Spacewatch || — || align=right | 2.7 km || 
|-id=025 bgcolor=#d6d6d6
| 414025 ||  || — || May 7, 2007 || Mount Lemmon || Mount Lemmon Survey || — || align=right | 2.7 km || 
|-id=026 bgcolor=#fefefe
| 414026 Bochonko ||  ||  || June 11, 2007 || Mauna Kea || D. D. Balam || — || align=right data-sort-value="0.89" | 890 m || 
|-id=027 bgcolor=#d6d6d6
| 414027 ||  || — || June 22, 2007 || Kitt Peak || Spacewatch || TIR || align=right | 4.0 km || 
|-id=028 bgcolor=#fefefe
| 414028 ||  || — || June 17, 2007 || Kitt Peak || Spacewatch || — || align=right data-sort-value="0.72" | 720 m || 
|-id=029 bgcolor=#fefefe
| 414029 ||  || — || July 16, 2007 || La Sagra || OAM Obs. || — || align=right data-sort-value="0.75" | 750 m || 
|-id=030 bgcolor=#fefefe
| 414030 ||  || — || August 5, 2007 || Socorro || LINEAR || — || align=right | 1.2 km || 
|-id=031 bgcolor=#fefefe
| 414031 ||  || — || August 13, 2007 || Socorro || LINEAR || — || align=right data-sort-value="0.71" | 710 m || 
|-id=032 bgcolor=#FA8072
| 414032 ||  || — || August 8, 2007 || Socorro || LINEAR || — || align=right data-sort-value="0.87" | 870 m || 
|-id=033 bgcolor=#fefefe
| 414033 ||  || — || August 18, 2007 || Purple Mountain || PMO NEO || — || align=right data-sort-value="0.64" | 640 m || 
|-id=034 bgcolor=#fefefe
| 414034 ||  || — || September 4, 2007 || Catalina || CSS || — || align=right data-sort-value="0.72" | 720 m || 
|-id=035 bgcolor=#fefefe
| 414035 ||  || — || August 10, 2007 || Kitt Peak || Spacewatch || — || align=right data-sort-value="0.76" | 760 m || 
|-id=036 bgcolor=#fefefe
| 414036 ||  || — || September 9, 2007 || Kitt Peak || Spacewatch || — || align=right data-sort-value="0.65" | 650 m || 
|-id=037 bgcolor=#fefefe
| 414037 ||  || — || September 10, 2007 || Mount Lemmon || Mount Lemmon Survey || — || align=right data-sort-value="0.76" | 760 m || 
|-id=038 bgcolor=#fefefe
| 414038 ||  || — || September 10, 2007 || Mount Lemmon || Mount Lemmon Survey || — || align=right data-sort-value="0.70" | 700 m || 
|-id=039 bgcolor=#fefefe
| 414039 ||  || — || September 3, 2007 || Catalina || CSS || — || align=right data-sort-value="0.66" | 660 m || 
|-id=040 bgcolor=#fefefe
| 414040 ||  || — || September 11, 2007 || Mount Lemmon || Mount Lemmon Survey || — || align=right data-sort-value="0.63" | 630 m || 
|-id=041 bgcolor=#fefefe
| 414041 ||  || — || September 11, 2007 || Kitt Peak || Spacewatch || — || align=right data-sort-value="0.71" | 710 m || 
|-id=042 bgcolor=#fefefe
| 414042 ||  || — || September 11, 2007 || Mount Lemmon || Mount Lemmon Survey || — || align=right data-sort-value="0.81" | 810 m || 
|-id=043 bgcolor=#fefefe
| 414043 ||  || — || August 21, 2007 || Anderson Mesa || LONEOS || — || align=right data-sort-value="0.95" | 950 m || 
|-id=044 bgcolor=#fefefe
| 414044 ||  || — || September 12, 2007 || Mount Lemmon || Mount Lemmon Survey || — || align=right data-sort-value="0.91" | 910 m || 
|-id=045 bgcolor=#fefefe
| 414045 ||  || — || September 13, 2007 || Mount Lemmon || Mount Lemmon Survey || — || align=right data-sort-value="0.77" | 770 m || 
|-id=046 bgcolor=#fefefe
| 414046 ||  || — || October 9, 2004 || Kitt Peak || Spacewatch || — || align=right data-sort-value="0.83" | 830 m || 
|-id=047 bgcolor=#fefefe
| 414047 ||  || — || October 15, 2004 || Mount Lemmon || Mount Lemmon Survey || — || align=right data-sort-value="0.63" | 630 m || 
|-id=048 bgcolor=#fefefe
| 414048 ||  || — || January 16, 2005 || Kitt Peak || Spacewatch || — || align=right data-sort-value="0.64" | 640 m || 
|-id=049 bgcolor=#fefefe
| 414049 ||  || — || September 11, 2007 || Kitt Peak || Spacewatch || — || align=right data-sort-value="0.61" | 610 m || 
|-id=050 bgcolor=#d6d6d6
| 414050 ||  || — || September 11, 2007 || Kitt Peak || Spacewatch || 7:4 || align=right | 2.7 km || 
|-id=051 bgcolor=#fefefe
| 414051 ||  || — || September 12, 2007 || Anderson Mesa || LONEOS || — || align=right data-sort-value="0.84" | 840 m || 
|-id=052 bgcolor=#fefefe
| 414052 ||  || — || September 11, 2007 || Kitt Peak || Spacewatch || — || align=right data-sort-value="0.74" | 740 m || 
|-id=053 bgcolor=#fefefe
| 414053 ||  || — || September 9, 2007 || Kitt Peak || Spacewatch || V || align=right data-sort-value="0.56" | 560 m || 
|-id=054 bgcolor=#fefefe
| 414054 ||  || — || September 15, 2007 || Mount Lemmon || Mount Lemmon Survey || — || align=right data-sort-value="0.64" | 640 m || 
|-id=055 bgcolor=#fefefe
| 414055 ||  || — || September 15, 2007 || Mount Lemmon || Mount Lemmon Survey || — || align=right data-sort-value="0.89" | 890 m || 
|-id=056 bgcolor=#fefefe
| 414056 ||  || — || September 15, 2007 || Kitt Peak || Spacewatch || V || align=right data-sort-value="0.55" | 550 m || 
|-id=057 bgcolor=#fefefe
| 414057 ||  || — || September 11, 2007 || Kitt Peak || Spacewatch || — || align=right data-sort-value="0.64" | 640 m || 
|-id=058 bgcolor=#fefefe
| 414058 ||  || — || September 15, 2007 || Mount Lemmon || Mount Lemmon Survey || — || align=right data-sort-value="0.68" | 680 m || 
|-id=059 bgcolor=#fefefe
| 414059 ||  || — || September 14, 2007 || Mount Lemmon || Mount Lemmon Survey || — || align=right data-sort-value="0.93" | 930 m || 
|-id=060 bgcolor=#fefefe
| 414060 ||  || — || September 15, 2007 || Kitt Peak || Spacewatch || — || align=right data-sort-value="0.79" | 790 m || 
|-id=061 bgcolor=#fefefe
| 414061 ||  || — || September 11, 2007 || Catalina || CSS || — || align=right data-sort-value="0.81" | 810 m || 
|-id=062 bgcolor=#fefefe
| 414062 ||  || — || September 30, 2007 || Kitt Peak || Spacewatch || — || align=right data-sort-value="0.81" | 810 m || 
|-id=063 bgcolor=#fefefe
| 414063 ||  || — || September 12, 2007 || Mount Lemmon || Mount Lemmon Survey || — || align=right data-sort-value="0.77" | 770 m || 
|-id=064 bgcolor=#fefefe
| 414064 ||  || — || September 21, 2007 || Purple Mountain || PMO NEO || — || align=right data-sort-value="0.71" | 710 m || 
|-id=065 bgcolor=#fefefe
| 414065 ||  || — || September 24, 2007 || Kitt Peak || Spacewatch || — || align=right data-sort-value="0.60" | 600 m || 
|-id=066 bgcolor=#fefefe
| 414066 ||  || — || September 21, 2007 || XuYi || PMO NEO || — || align=right data-sort-value="0.68" | 680 m || 
|-id=067 bgcolor=#fefefe
| 414067 ||  || — || September 21, 2007 || XuYi || PMO NEO || — || align=right data-sort-value="0.94" | 940 m || 
|-id=068 bgcolor=#fefefe
| 414068 ||  || — || October 10, 2007 || Cordell-Lorenz || Cordell–Lorenz Obs. || — || align=right data-sort-value="0.57" | 570 m || 
|-id=069 bgcolor=#fefefe
| 414069 ||  || — || September 8, 2007 || Mount Lemmon || Mount Lemmon Survey || — || align=right data-sort-value="0.73" | 730 m || 
|-id=070 bgcolor=#fefefe
| 414070 ||  || — || September 12, 2007 || Mount Lemmon || Mount Lemmon Survey || — || align=right data-sort-value="0.65" | 650 m || 
|-id=071 bgcolor=#fefefe
| 414071 ||  || — || September 8, 2007 || Mount Lemmon || Mount Lemmon Survey || — || align=right data-sort-value="0.73" | 730 m || 
|-id=072 bgcolor=#fefefe
| 414072 ||  || — || October 4, 2007 || Kitt Peak || Spacewatch || — || align=right data-sort-value="0.72" | 720 m || 
|-id=073 bgcolor=#fefefe
| 414073 ||  || — || October 4, 2007 || Kitt Peak || Spacewatch || — || align=right data-sort-value="0.87" | 870 m || 
|-id=074 bgcolor=#fefefe
| 414074 ||  || — || October 7, 2007 || Mount Lemmon || Mount Lemmon Survey || — || align=right data-sort-value="0.66" | 660 m || 
|-id=075 bgcolor=#fefefe
| 414075 ||  || — || September 11, 2007 || Mount Lemmon || Mount Lemmon Survey || — || align=right data-sort-value="0.60" | 600 m || 
|-id=076 bgcolor=#fefefe
| 414076 ||  || — || October 5, 2007 || Kitt Peak || Spacewatch || — || align=right data-sort-value="0.87" | 870 m || 
|-id=077 bgcolor=#fefefe
| 414077 ||  || — || March 23, 2006 || Kitt Peak || Spacewatch || — || align=right data-sort-value="0.79" | 790 m || 
|-id=078 bgcolor=#fefefe
| 414078 ||  || — || October 8, 2007 || Mount Lemmon || Mount Lemmon Survey || — || align=right data-sort-value="0.88" | 880 m || 
|-id=079 bgcolor=#fefefe
| 414079 ||  || — || October 4, 2007 || Catalina || CSS || — || align=right | 1.0 km || 
|-id=080 bgcolor=#fefefe
| 414080 ||  || — || August 24, 2007 || Kitt Peak || Spacewatch || — || align=right data-sort-value="0.85" | 850 m || 
|-id=081 bgcolor=#fefefe
| 414081 ||  || — || October 6, 2007 || Kitt Peak || Spacewatch || — || align=right data-sort-value="0.76" | 760 m || 
|-id=082 bgcolor=#fefefe
| 414082 ||  || — || September 15, 2007 || Mount Lemmon || Mount Lemmon Survey || — || align=right data-sort-value="0.56" | 560 m || 
|-id=083 bgcolor=#fefefe
| 414083 ||  || — || October 6, 2007 || Kitt Peak || Spacewatch || — || align=right data-sort-value="0.55" | 550 m || 
|-id=084 bgcolor=#fefefe
| 414084 ||  || — || October 9, 2007 || Socorro || LINEAR || — || align=right data-sort-value="0.96" | 960 m || 
|-id=085 bgcolor=#fefefe
| 414085 ||  || — || October 9, 2007 || Socorro || LINEAR || — || align=right | 1.1 km || 
|-id=086 bgcolor=#fefefe
| 414086 ||  || — || October 4, 2007 || Kitt Peak || Spacewatch || — || align=right data-sort-value="0.88" | 880 m || 
|-id=087 bgcolor=#fefefe
| 414087 ||  || — || October 6, 2007 || Socorro || LINEAR || — || align=right data-sort-value="0.93" | 930 m || 
|-id=088 bgcolor=#fefefe
| 414088 ||  || — || September 9, 2007 || Mount Lemmon || Mount Lemmon Survey || — || align=right data-sort-value="0.73" | 730 m || 
|-id=089 bgcolor=#fefefe
| 414089 ||  || — || October 8, 2007 || Anderson Mesa || LONEOS || — || align=right | 1.1 km || 
|-id=090 bgcolor=#fefefe
| 414090 ||  || — || October 5, 2007 || Kitt Peak || Spacewatch || — || align=right data-sort-value="0.96" | 960 m || 
|-id=091 bgcolor=#fefefe
| 414091 ||  || — || January 16, 2005 || Kitt Peak || Spacewatch || — || align=right data-sort-value="0.64" | 640 m || 
|-id=092 bgcolor=#fefefe
| 414092 ||  || — || October 7, 2007 || Kitt Peak || Spacewatch || — || align=right | 1.1 km || 
|-id=093 bgcolor=#fefefe
| 414093 ||  || — || October 7, 2007 || Kitt Peak || Spacewatch || — || align=right data-sort-value="0.74" | 740 m || 
|-id=094 bgcolor=#fefefe
| 414094 ||  || — || October 7, 2007 || Kitt Peak || Spacewatch || — || align=right data-sort-value="0.65" | 650 m || 
|-id=095 bgcolor=#fefefe
| 414095 ||  || — || September 25, 2007 || Mount Lemmon || Mount Lemmon Survey || — || align=right data-sort-value="0.61" | 610 m || 
|-id=096 bgcolor=#fefefe
| 414096 ||  || — || October 8, 2007 || Kitt Peak || Spacewatch || — || align=right data-sort-value="0.64" | 640 m || 
|-id=097 bgcolor=#fefefe
| 414097 ||  || — || October 8, 2007 || Mount Lemmon || Mount Lemmon Survey || — || align=right data-sort-value="0.62" | 620 m || 
|-id=098 bgcolor=#fefefe
| 414098 ||  || — || October 8, 2007 || Catalina || CSS || — || align=right data-sort-value="0.85" | 850 m || 
|-id=099 bgcolor=#fefefe
| 414099 ||  || — || October 8, 2007 || Catalina || CSS || — || align=right data-sort-value="0.85" | 850 m || 
|-id=100 bgcolor=#fefefe
| 414100 ||  || — || September 14, 2007 || Mount Lemmon || Mount Lemmon Survey || — || align=right data-sort-value="0.82" | 820 m || 
|}

414101–414200 

|-bgcolor=#fefefe
| 414101 ||  || — || September 19, 2007 || Kitt Peak || Spacewatch || — || align=right data-sort-value="0.79" | 790 m || 
|-id=102 bgcolor=#fefefe
| 414102 ||  || — || September 15, 2007 || Mount Lemmon || Mount Lemmon Survey || — || align=right data-sort-value="0.74" | 740 m || 
|-id=103 bgcolor=#fefefe
| 414103 ||  || — || October 12, 2007 || Kitt Peak || Spacewatch || — || align=right data-sort-value="0.85" | 850 m || 
|-id=104 bgcolor=#fefefe
| 414104 ||  || — || October 14, 2007 || Mount Lemmon || Mount Lemmon Survey || — || align=right data-sort-value="0.59" | 590 m || 
|-id=105 bgcolor=#fefefe
| 414105 ||  || — || February 9, 2005 || Mount Lemmon || Mount Lemmon Survey || — || align=right data-sort-value="0.62" | 620 m || 
|-id=106 bgcolor=#fefefe
| 414106 ||  || — || October 15, 2007 || Catalina || CSS || — || align=right data-sort-value="0.62" | 620 m || 
|-id=107 bgcolor=#fefefe
| 414107 ||  || — || July 24, 2003 || Campo Imperatore || CINEOS || — || align=right data-sort-value="0.77" | 770 m || 
|-id=108 bgcolor=#fefefe
| 414108 ||  || — || October 15, 2007 || Catalina || CSS || — || align=right data-sort-value="0.80" | 800 m || 
|-id=109 bgcolor=#fefefe
| 414109 ||  || — || October 9, 2007 || Mount Lemmon || Mount Lemmon Survey || NYS || align=right data-sort-value="0.68" | 680 m || 
|-id=110 bgcolor=#fefefe
| 414110 ||  || — || October 17, 2007 || Anderson Mesa || LONEOS || — || align=right data-sort-value="0.98" | 980 m || 
|-id=111 bgcolor=#fefefe
| 414111 ||  || — || September 10, 2007 || Mount Lemmon || Mount Lemmon Survey || — || align=right data-sort-value="0.71" | 710 m || 
|-id=112 bgcolor=#fefefe
| 414112 ||  || — || October 8, 2007 || Mount Lemmon || Mount Lemmon Survey || — || align=right | 1.1 km || 
|-id=113 bgcolor=#fefefe
| 414113 ||  || — || September 25, 2007 || Mount Lemmon || Mount Lemmon Survey || — || align=right data-sort-value="0.68" | 680 m || 
|-id=114 bgcolor=#fefefe
| 414114 ||  || — || October 16, 2007 || Mount Lemmon || Mount Lemmon Survey || — || align=right data-sort-value="0.83" | 830 m || 
|-id=115 bgcolor=#fefefe
| 414115 ||  || — || October 12, 2007 || Socorro || LINEAR || V || align=right data-sort-value="0.73" | 730 m || 
|-id=116 bgcolor=#fefefe
| 414116 ||  || — || October 19, 2007 || Catalina || CSS || — || align=right data-sort-value="0.73" | 730 m || 
|-id=117 bgcolor=#fefefe
| 414117 ||  || — || October 24, 2007 || Mount Lemmon || Mount Lemmon Survey || — || align=right data-sort-value="0.62" | 620 m || 
|-id=118 bgcolor=#fefefe
| 414118 ||  || — || October 24, 2007 || Mount Lemmon || Mount Lemmon Survey || — || align=right data-sort-value="0.71" | 710 m || 
|-id=119 bgcolor=#fefefe
| 414119 ||  || — || October 30, 2007 || Mount Lemmon || Mount Lemmon Survey || — || align=right data-sort-value="0.63" | 630 m || 
|-id=120 bgcolor=#fefefe
| 414120 ||  || — || October 30, 2007 || Catalina || CSS || — || align=right data-sort-value="0.86" | 860 m || 
|-id=121 bgcolor=#fefefe
| 414121 ||  || — || March 16, 2005 || Mount Lemmon || Mount Lemmon Survey || MAS || align=right data-sort-value="0.72" | 720 m || 
|-id=122 bgcolor=#fefefe
| 414122 ||  || — || October 8, 2007 || Mount Lemmon || Mount Lemmon Survey || — || align=right data-sort-value="0.78" | 780 m || 
|-id=123 bgcolor=#fefefe
| 414123 ||  || — || October 30, 2007 || Kitt Peak || Spacewatch || — || align=right data-sort-value="0.64" | 640 m || 
|-id=124 bgcolor=#fefefe
| 414124 ||  || — || October 16, 2007 || Kitt Peak || Spacewatch || — || align=right data-sort-value="0.81" | 810 m || 
|-id=125 bgcolor=#fefefe
| 414125 ||  || — || October 20, 2007 || Socorro || LINEAR || — || align=right data-sort-value="0.76" | 760 m || 
|-id=126 bgcolor=#fefefe
| 414126 ||  || — || October 24, 2007 || Mount Lemmon || Mount Lemmon Survey || — || align=right | 1.0 km || 
|-id=127 bgcolor=#fefefe
| 414127 ||  || — || October 10, 2007 || Mount Lemmon || Mount Lemmon Survey || — || align=right data-sort-value="0.75" | 750 m || 
|-id=128 bgcolor=#fefefe
| 414128 ||  || — || November 1, 2007 || Kitt Peak || Spacewatch || — || align=right data-sort-value="0.83" | 830 m || 
|-id=129 bgcolor=#fefefe
| 414129 ||  || — || October 9, 2007 || Kitt Peak || Spacewatch || — || align=right data-sort-value="0.79" | 790 m || 
|-id=130 bgcolor=#fefefe
| 414130 ||  || — || November 1, 2007 || Kitt Peak || Spacewatch || — || align=right data-sort-value="0.63" | 630 m || 
|-id=131 bgcolor=#fefefe
| 414131 ||  || — || October 20, 2007 || Mount Lemmon || Mount Lemmon Survey || — || align=right data-sort-value="0.77" | 770 m || 
|-id=132 bgcolor=#fefefe
| 414132 ||  || — || November 1, 2007 || Kitt Peak || Spacewatch || — || align=right data-sort-value="0.71" | 710 m || 
|-id=133 bgcolor=#fefefe
| 414133 ||  || — || November 1, 2007 || Kitt Peak || Spacewatch || — || align=right data-sort-value="0.72" | 720 m || 
|-id=134 bgcolor=#fefefe
| 414134 ||  || — || November 6, 2007 || 7300 Observatory || W. K. Y. Yeung || — || align=right | 1.2 km || 
|-id=135 bgcolor=#fefefe
| 414135 ||  || — || November 3, 2007 || Kitt Peak || Spacewatch || — || align=right data-sort-value="0.76" | 760 m || 
|-id=136 bgcolor=#fefefe
| 414136 ||  || — || November 4, 2007 || Kitt Peak || Spacewatch || — || align=right data-sort-value="0.70" | 700 m || 
|-id=137 bgcolor=#fefefe
| 414137 ||  || — || November 5, 2007 || Kitt Peak || Spacewatch || — || align=right data-sort-value="0.70" | 700 m || 
|-id=138 bgcolor=#fefefe
| 414138 ||  || — || November 9, 2007 || Kitt Peak || Spacewatch || — || align=right data-sort-value="0.82" | 820 m || 
|-id=139 bgcolor=#fefefe
| 414139 ||  || — || October 13, 2007 || Mount Lemmon || Mount Lemmon Survey || — || align=right data-sort-value="0.84" | 840 m || 
|-id=140 bgcolor=#fefefe
| 414140 ||  || — || November 13, 2007 || Kitt Peak || Spacewatch || — || align=right data-sort-value="0.59" | 590 m || 
|-id=141 bgcolor=#fefefe
| 414141 ||  || — || November 13, 2007 || Mount Lemmon || Mount Lemmon Survey || — || align=right data-sort-value="0.70" | 700 m || 
|-id=142 bgcolor=#fefefe
| 414142 ||  || — || November 13, 2007 || Mount Lemmon || Mount Lemmon Survey || — || align=right data-sort-value="0.70" | 700 m || 
|-id=143 bgcolor=#fefefe
| 414143 ||  || — || March 8, 2005 || Mount Lemmon || Mount Lemmon Survey || — || align=right data-sort-value="0.57" | 570 m || 
|-id=144 bgcolor=#fefefe
| 414144 ||  || — || November 5, 2007 || Kitt Peak || Spacewatch || V || align=right data-sort-value="0.70" | 700 m || 
|-id=145 bgcolor=#fefefe
| 414145 ||  || — || September 15, 2007 || Mount Lemmon || Mount Lemmon Survey || MAS || align=right data-sort-value="0.59" | 590 m || 
|-id=146 bgcolor=#fefefe
| 414146 ||  || — || November 5, 2007 || Kitt Peak || Spacewatch || NYS || align=right data-sort-value="0.62" | 620 m || 
|-id=147 bgcolor=#fefefe
| 414147 ||  || — || November 7, 2007 || Mount Lemmon || Mount Lemmon Survey || — || align=right data-sort-value="0.92" | 920 m || 
|-id=148 bgcolor=#fefefe
| 414148 ||  || — || November 6, 2007 || Kitt Peak || Spacewatch || NYS || align=right data-sort-value="0.54" | 540 m || 
|-id=149 bgcolor=#fefefe
| 414149 ||  || — || November 8, 2007 || Kitt Peak || Spacewatch || — || align=right data-sort-value="0.84" | 840 m || 
|-id=150 bgcolor=#fefefe
| 414150 ||  || — || September 11, 2007 || Kitt Peak || Spacewatch || — || align=right data-sort-value="0.70" | 700 m || 
|-id=151 bgcolor=#fefefe
| 414151 ||  || — || October 14, 2007 || Kitt Peak || Spacewatch || ERI || align=right | 1.6 km || 
|-id=152 bgcolor=#fefefe
| 414152 ||  || — || October 10, 2007 || Kitt Peak || Spacewatch || V || align=right data-sort-value="0.68" | 680 m || 
|-id=153 bgcolor=#fefefe
| 414153 ||  || — || October 11, 2007 || Kitt Peak || Spacewatch || — || align=right data-sort-value="0.66" | 660 m || 
|-id=154 bgcolor=#fefefe
| 414154 ||  || — || November 17, 2007 || Mount Lemmon || Mount Lemmon Survey || V || align=right data-sort-value="0.65" | 650 m || 
|-id=155 bgcolor=#fefefe
| 414155 ||  || — || November 19, 2007 || Kitt Peak || Spacewatch || — || align=right data-sort-value="0.64" | 640 m || 
|-id=156 bgcolor=#fefefe
| 414156 ||  || — || November 16, 2007 || Mount Lemmon || Mount Lemmon Survey || — || align=right data-sort-value="0.89" | 890 m || 
|-id=157 bgcolor=#fefefe
| 414157 ||  || — || December 11, 2007 || Skylive Obs. || F. Tozzi || — || align=right | 1.2 km || 
|-id=158 bgcolor=#fefefe
| 414158 ||  || — || December 14, 2007 || Mount Lemmon || Mount Lemmon Survey || — || align=right data-sort-value="0.66" | 660 m || 
|-id=159 bgcolor=#fefefe
| 414159 ||  || — || November 2, 2007 || Kitt Peak || Spacewatch || — || align=right data-sort-value="0.76" | 760 m || 
|-id=160 bgcolor=#fefefe
| 414160 ||  || — || December 17, 2007 || Mount Lemmon || Mount Lemmon Survey || — || align=right data-sort-value="0.69" | 690 m || 
|-id=161 bgcolor=#fefefe
| 414161 ||  || — || December 30, 2007 || Mount Lemmon || Mount Lemmon Survey || MAS || align=right data-sort-value="0.85" | 850 m || 
|-id=162 bgcolor=#fefefe
| 414162 ||  || — || December 31, 2007 || Mount Lemmon || Mount Lemmon Survey || — || align=right | 1.3 km || 
|-id=163 bgcolor=#fefefe
| 414163 ||  || — || January 10, 2008 || Mount Lemmon || Mount Lemmon Survey || — || align=right data-sort-value="0.70" | 700 m || 
|-id=164 bgcolor=#fefefe
| 414164 ||  || — || January 11, 2008 || Kitt Peak || Spacewatch || NYS || align=right data-sort-value="0.73" | 730 m || 
|-id=165 bgcolor=#fefefe
| 414165 ||  || — || January 11, 2008 || Kitt Peak || Spacewatch || NYS || align=right data-sort-value="0.57" | 570 m || 
|-id=166 bgcolor=#E9E9E9
| 414166 ||  || — || January 11, 2008 || Kitt Peak || Spacewatch || — || align=right | 2.3 km || 
|-id=167 bgcolor=#fefefe
| 414167 ||  || — || November 21, 2007 || Mount Lemmon || Mount Lemmon Survey || — || align=right data-sort-value="0.72" | 720 m || 
|-id=168 bgcolor=#fefefe
| 414168 ||  || — || November 11, 2007 || Mount Lemmon || Mount Lemmon Survey || MAS || align=right data-sort-value="0.84" | 840 m || 
|-id=169 bgcolor=#fefefe
| 414169 ||  || — || January 13, 2008 || Kitt Peak || Spacewatch || — || align=right data-sort-value="0.79" | 790 m || 
|-id=170 bgcolor=#fefefe
| 414170 ||  || — || January 14, 2008 || Kitt Peak || Spacewatch || NYS || align=right data-sort-value="0.51" | 510 m || 
|-id=171 bgcolor=#fefefe
| 414171 ||  || — || January 14, 2008 || Kitt Peak || Spacewatch || — || align=right data-sort-value="0.67" | 670 m || 
|-id=172 bgcolor=#fefefe
| 414172 ||  || — || January 13, 2008 || Kitt Peak || Spacewatch || — || align=right data-sort-value="0.72" | 720 m || 
|-id=173 bgcolor=#fefefe
| 414173 ||  || — || January 1, 2008 || Kitt Peak || Spacewatch || MAS || align=right data-sort-value="0.56" | 560 m || 
|-id=174 bgcolor=#fefefe
| 414174 ||  || — || January 11, 2008 || Catalina || CSS || — || align=right | 1.0 km || 
|-id=175 bgcolor=#fefefe
| 414175 ||  || — || January 19, 2008 || Kitt Peak || Spacewatch || — || align=right data-sort-value="0.71" | 710 m || 
|-id=176 bgcolor=#fefefe
| 414176 ||  || — || January 30, 2008 || Mount Lemmon || Mount Lemmon Survey || — || align=right data-sort-value="0.91" | 910 m || 
|-id=177 bgcolor=#E9E9E9
| 414177 ||  || — || January 31, 2008 || Mount Lemmon || Mount Lemmon Survey || — || align=right data-sort-value="0.98" | 980 m || 
|-id=178 bgcolor=#fefefe
| 414178 ||  || — || December 31, 2007 || Mount Lemmon || Mount Lemmon Survey || MAS || align=right data-sort-value="0.53" | 530 m || 
|-id=179 bgcolor=#fefefe
| 414179 ||  || — || February 2, 2008 || Mount Lemmon || Mount Lemmon Survey || NYS || align=right data-sort-value="0.66" | 660 m || 
|-id=180 bgcolor=#fefefe
| 414180 ||  || — || February 1, 2008 || Kitt Peak || Spacewatch || MAS || align=right data-sort-value="0.70" | 700 m || 
|-id=181 bgcolor=#fefefe
| 414181 ||  || — || February 2, 2008 || Kitt Peak || Spacewatch || MAS || align=right data-sort-value="0.65" | 650 m || 
|-id=182 bgcolor=#fefefe
| 414182 ||  || — || February 2, 2008 || Mount Lemmon || Mount Lemmon Survey || — || align=right data-sort-value="0.79" | 790 m || 
|-id=183 bgcolor=#fefefe
| 414183 ||  || — || January 10, 2008 || Kitt Peak || Spacewatch || — || align=right data-sort-value="0.73" | 730 m || 
|-id=184 bgcolor=#E9E9E9
| 414184 ||  || — || June 29, 2005 || Kitt Peak || Spacewatch || — || align=right | 1.2 km || 
|-id=185 bgcolor=#E9E9E9
| 414185 ||  || — || February 9, 2008 || Kitt Peak || Spacewatch || — || align=right | 1.4 km || 
|-id=186 bgcolor=#E9E9E9
| 414186 ||  || — || February 9, 2008 || Kitt Peak || Spacewatch || — || align=right | 1.4 km || 
|-id=187 bgcolor=#E9E9E9
| 414187 ||  || — || February 8, 2008 || Kitt Peak || Spacewatch || — || align=right | 1.8 km || 
|-id=188 bgcolor=#E9E9E9
| 414188 ||  || — || February 8, 2008 || Kitt Peak || Spacewatch || — || align=right | 1.4 km || 
|-id=189 bgcolor=#fefefe
| 414189 ||  || — || February 9, 2008 || Kitt Peak || Spacewatch || — || align=right data-sort-value="0.79" | 790 m || 
|-id=190 bgcolor=#E9E9E9
| 414190 ||  || — || February 12, 2008 || Mount Lemmon || Mount Lemmon Survey || — || align=right | 1.1 km || 
|-id=191 bgcolor=#E9E9E9
| 414191 ||  || — || February 13, 2008 || Mount Lemmon || Mount Lemmon Survey || — || align=right | 1.4 km || 
|-id=192 bgcolor=#E9E9E9
| 414192 ||  || — || February 7, 2008 || Mount Lemmon || Mount Lemmon Survey || — || align=right data-sort-value="0.88" | 880 m || 
|-id=193 bgcolor=#E9E9E9
| 414193 ||  || — || February 10, 2008 || Mount Lemmon || Mount Lemmon Survey || — || align=right | 1.4 km || 
|-id=194 bgcolor=#E9E9E9
| 414194 ||  || — || February 7, 2008 || Mount Lemmon || Mount Lemmon Survey || — || align=right | 1.6 km || 
|-id=195 bgcolor=#fefefe
| 414195 ||  || — || February 1, 2008 || Kitt Peak || Spacewatch || NYS || align=right data-sort-value="0.61" | 610 m || 
|-id=196 bgcolor=#E9E9E9
| 414196 ||  || — || February 2, 2008 || Kitt Peak || Spacewatch || ADE || align=right | 1.9 km || 
|-id=197 bgcolor=#E9E9E9
| 414197 ||  || — || February 13, 2008 || Kitt Peak || Spacewatch || — || align=right | 1.4 km || 
|-id=198 bgcolor=#fefefe
| 414198 ||  || — || December 18, 2007 || Mount Lemmon || Mount Lemmon Survey || — || align=right data-sort-value="0.63" | 630 m || 
|-id=199 bgcolor=#d6d6d6
| 414199 ||  || — || February 27, 2008 || Anderson Mesa || LONEOS || 3:2 || align=right | 5.3 km || 
|-id=200 bgcolor=#E9E9E9
| 414200 ||  || — || February 18, 2008 || Mount Lemmon || Mount Lemmon Survey || — || align=right | 1.1 km || 
|}

414201–414300 

|-bgcolor=#E9E9E9
| 414201 ||  || — || February 27, 2008 || Mount Lemmon || Mount Lemmon Survey || — || align=right | 1.5 km || 
|-id=202 bgcolor=#E9E9E9
| 414202 ||  || — || February 28, 2008 || Kitt Peak || Spacewatch || MAR || align=right | 1.0 km || 
|-id=203 bgcolor=#E9E9E9
| 414203 ||  || — || January 18, 2008 || Mount Lemmon || Mount Lemmon Survey || EUN || align=right | 1.4 km || 
|-id=204 bgcolor=#fefefe
| 414204 ||  || — || February 28, 2008 || Kitt Peak || Spacewatch || H || align=right data-sort-value="0.67" | 670 m || 
|-id=205 bgcolor=#E9E9E9
| 414205 ||  || — || February 29, 2008 || Kitt Peak || Spacewatch || — || align=right | 2.2 km || 
|-id=206 bgcolor=#E9E9E9
| 414206 ||  || — || February 9, 2008 || Kitt Peak || Spacewatch || — || align=right | 1.4 km || 
|-id=207 bgcolor=#E9E9E9
| 414207 ||  || — || February 28, 2008 || Mount Lemmon || Mount Lemmon Survey || — || align=right | 1.4 km || 
|-id=208 bgcolor=#E9E9E9
| 414208 ||  || — || March 2, 2008 || Marly || P. Kocher || — || align=right | 1.3 km || 
|-id=209 bgcolor=#E9E9E9
| 414209 ||  || — || March 1, 2008 || Kitt Peak || Spacewatch || — || align=right | 1.2 km || 
|-id=210 bgcolor=#E9E9E9
| 414210 ||  || — || March 1, 2008 || Kitt Peak || Spacewatch || HNS || align=right | 1.0 km || 
|-id=211 bgcolor=#E9E9E9
| 414211 ||  || — || February 13, 2008 || Mount Lemmon || Mount Lemmon Survey || — || align=right | 1.8 km || 
|-id=212 bgcolor=#E9E9E9
| 414212 ||  || — || March 3, 2008 || Catalina || CSS || — || align=right | 1.6 km || 
|-id=213 bgcolor=#E9E9E9
| 414213 ||  || — || March 4, 2008 || Mount Lemmon || Mount Lemmon Survey || — || align=right | 2.3 km || 
|-id=214 bgcolor=#E9E9E9
| 414214 ||  || — || March 5, 2008 || Kitt Peak || Spacewatch || — || align=right | 1.4 km || 
|-id=215 bgcolor=#E9E9E9
| 414215 ||  || — || March 5, 2008 || Kitt Peak || Spacewatch || — || align=right | 1.4 km || 
|-id=216 bgcolor=#fefefe
| 414216 ||  || — || February 8, 2008 || Catalina || CSS || — || align=right | 1.0 km || 
|-id=217 bgcolor=#E9E9E9
| 414217 ||  || — || March 7, 2008 || Kitt Peak || Spacewatch || MIS || align=right | 2.6 km || 
|-id=218 bgcolor=#fefefe
| 414218 ||  || — || February 2, 2008 || Mount Lemmon || Mount Lemmon Survey || H || align=right data-sort-value="0.86" | 860 m || 
|-id=219 bgcolor=#E9E9E9
| 414219 ||  || — || March 10, 2008 || Kitt Peak || Spacewatch || — || align=right | 1.7 km || 
|-id=220 bgcolor=#E9E9E9
| 414220 ||  || — || March 10, 2008 || Mount Lemmon || Mount Lemmon Survey || — || align=right | 1.1 km || 
|-id=221 bgcolor=#E9E9E9
| 414221 ||  || — || March 2, 2008 || Mount Lemmon || Mount Lemmon Survey || — || align=right | 1.7 km || 
|-id=222 bgcolor=#E9E9E9
| 414222 ||  || — || March 13, 2008 || Catalina || CSS || — || align=right | 1.8 km || 
|-id=223 bgcolor=#E9E9E9
| 414223 ||  || — || February 10, 2008 || Kitt Peak || Spacewatch || — || align=right | 1.7 km || 
|-id=224 bgcolor=#fefefe
| 414224 ||  || — || February 27, 2008 || Mount Lemmon || Mount Lemmon Survey || H || align=right data-sort-value="0.64" | 640 m || 
|-id=225 bgcolor=#E9E9E9
| 414225 ||  || — || March 10, 2008 || Mount Lemmon || Mount Lemmon Survey || — || align=right data-sort-value="0.87" | 870 m || 
|-id=226 bgcolor=#fefefe
| 414226 ||  || — || March 28, 2008 || Kitt Peak || Spacewatch || NYS || align=right data-sort-value="0.66" | 660 m || 
|-id=227 bgcolor=#E9E9E9
| 414227 ||  || — || March 28, 2008 || Kitt Peak || Spacewatch || — || align=right | 1.7 km || 
|-id=228 bgcolor=#E9E9E9
| 414228 ||  || — || February 9, 2008 || Mount Lemmon || Mount Lemmon Survey || — || align=right | 1.5 km || 
|-id=229 bgcolor=#E9E9E9
| 414229 ||  || — || March 5, 2008 || Kitt Peak || Spacewatch || — || align=right | 1.9 km || 
|-id=230 bgcolor=#E9E9E9
| 414230 ||  || — || March 28, 2008 || Mount Lemmon || Mount Lemmon Survey || — || align=right | 1.1 km || 
|-id=231 bgcolor=#E9E9E9
| 414231 ||  || — || March 28, 2008 || Kitt Peak || Spacewatch || — || align=right | 1.8 km || 
|-id=232 bgcolor=#E9E9E9
| 414232 ||  || — || March 28, 2008 || Kitt Peak || Spacewatch || — || align=right | 1.6 km || 
|-id=233 bgcolor=#E9E9E9
| 414233 ||  || — || March 30, 2008 || Kitt Peak || Spacewatch || — || align=right | 1.5 km || 
|-id=234 bgcolor=#E9E9E9
| 414234 ||  || — || March 31, 2008 || Kitt Peak || Spacewatch || MAR || align=right data-sort-value="0.86" | 860 m || 
|-id=235 bgcolor=#E9E9E9
| 414235 ||  || — || March 27, 2008 || Kitt Peak || Spacewatch || — || align=right | 1.1 km || 
|-id=236 bgcolor=#E9E9E9
| 414236 ||  || — || March 10, 2008 || Kitt Peak || Spacewatch || — || align=right | 1.4 km || 
|-id=237 bgcolor=#E9E9E9
| 414237 ||  || — || March 31, 2008 || Kitt Peak || Spacewatch || (5) || align=right data-sort-value="0.98" | 980 m || 
|-id=238 bgcolor=#E9E9E9
| 414238 ||  || — || March 31, 2008 || Kitt Peak || Spacewatch || — || align=right | 2.3 km || 
|-id=239 bgcolor=#E9E9E9
| 414239 ||  || — || March 30, 2008 || Kitt Peak || Spacewatch || — || align=right | 2.2 km || 
|-id=240 bgcolor=#E9E9E9
| 414240 ||  || — || March 29, 2008 || Kitt Peak || Spacewatch || — || align=right | 2.6 km || 
|-id=241 bgcolor=#fefefe
| 414241 ||  || — || November 15, 2006 || Mount Lemmon || Mount Lemmon Survey || MAS || align=right data-sort-value="0.83" | 830 m || 
|-id=242 bgcolor=#E9E9E9
| 414242 ||  || — || March 31, 2008 || Mount Lemmon || Mount Lemmon Survey || MAR || align=right data-sort-value="0.95" | 950 m || 
|-id=243 bgcolor=#E9E9E9
| 414243 ||  || — || March 27, 2008 || Kitt Peak || Spacewatch || — || align=right | 1.2 km || 
|-id=244 bgcolor=#E9E9E9
| 414244 ||  || — || March 5, 2008 || Catalina || CSS || — || align=right | 2.7 km || 
|-id=245 bgcolor=#E9E9E9
| 414245 ||  || — || March 10, 2008 || Mount Lemmon || Mount Lemmon Survey || — || align=right | 1.1 km || 
|-id=246 bgcolor=#E9E9E9
| 414246 ||  || — || April 1, 2008 || Kitt Peak || Spacewatch || — || align=right | 1.7 km || 
|-id=247 bgcolor=#E9E9E9
| 414247 ||  || — || April 3, 2008 || Mount Lemmon || Mount Lemmon Survey || — || align=right | 1.5 km || 
|-id=248 bgcolor=#E9E9E9
| 414248 ||  || — || March 26, 2008 || Kitt Peak || Spacewatch || ADE || align=right | 2.1 km || 
|-id=249 bgcolor=#C2FFFF
| 414249 ||  || — || April 3, 2008 || Kitt Peak || Spacewatch || L5 || align=right | 9.6 km || 
|-id=250 bgcolor=#E9E9E9
| 414250 ||  || — || April 3, 2008 || Kitt Peak || Spacewatch || MAR || align=right | 1.4 km || 
|-id=251 bgcolor=#E9E9E9
| 414251 ||  || — || April 3, 2008 || Kitt Peak || Spacewatch || JUN || align=right | 1.4 km || 
|-id=252 bgcolor=#E9E9E9
| 414252 ||  || — || April 3, 2008 || Kitt Peak || Spacewatch || — || align=right | 2.2 km || 
|-id=253 bgcolor=#E9E9E9
| 414253 ||  || — || March 29, 2008 || Kitt Peak || Spacewatch || AGN || align=right | 1.3 km || 
|-id=254 bgcolor=#E9E9E9
| 414254 ||  || — || April 3, 2008 || Kitt Peak || Spacewatch || — || align=right | 1.5 km || 
|-id=255 bgcolor=#E9E9E9
| 414255 ||  || — || April 7, 2008 || Kitt Peak || Spacewatch || — || align=right | 2.1 km || 
|-id=256 bgcolor=#C2FFFF
| 414256 ||  || — || April 7, 2008 || Kitt Peak || Spacewatch || L5 || align=right | 9.2 km || 
|-id=257 bgcolor=#E9E9E9
| 414257 ||  || — || April 7, 2008 || Kitt Peak || Spacewatch || — || align=right | 1.8 km || 
|-id=258 bgcolor=#E9E9E9
| 414258 ||  || — || April 3, 2008 || Kitt Peak || Spacewatch || — || align=right | 2.3 km || 
|-id=259 bgcolor=#fefefe
| 414259 ||  || — || April 10, 2008 || Kitt Peak || Spacewatch || — || align=right data-sort-value="0.74" | 740 m || 
|-id=260 bgcolor=#E9E9E9
| 414260 ||  || — || March 31, 2008 || Kitt Peak || Spacewatch || — || align=right | 1.3 km || 
|-id=261 bgcolor=#E9E9E9
| 414261 ||  || — || April 6, 2008 || Kitt Peak || Spacewatch || — || align=right | 1.5 km || 
|-id=262 bgcolor=#fefefe
| 414262 ||  || — || April 6, 2008 || Mount Lemmon || Mount Lemmon Survey || H || align=right data-sort-value="0.40" | 400 m || 
|-id=263 bgcolor=#E9E9E9
| 414263 ||  || — || March 31, 2008 || Mount Lemmon || Mount Lemmon Survey || — || align=right | 1.1 km || 
|-id=264 bgcolor=#fefefe
| 414264 ||  || — || March 29, 2008 || Kitt Peak || Spacewatch || H || align=right data-sort-value="0.69" | 690 m || 
|-id=265 bgcolor=#E9E9E9
| 414265 ||  || — || April 7, 2008 || Catalina || CSS || EUN || align=right | 1.5 km || 
|-id=266 bgcolor=#fefefe
| 414266 ||  || — || April 13, 2008 || Kitt Peak || Spacewatch || — || align=right data-sort-value="0.91" | 910 m || 
|-id=267 bgcolor=#E9E9E9
| 414267 ||  || — || March 2, 2008 || Kitt Peak || Spacewatch || — || align=right | 2.0 km || 
|-id=268 bgcolor=#E9E9E9
| 414268 ||  || — || March 10, 2008 || Kitt Peak || Spacewatch || — || align=right | 1.1 km || 
|-id=269 bgcolor=#E9E9E9
| 414269 ||  || — || April 4, 2008 || Kitt Peak || Spacewatch || — || align=right | 1.6 km || 
|-id=270 bgcolor=#E9E9E9
| 414270 ||  || — || April 26, 2008 || Kitt Peak || Spacewatch || — || align=right | 1.6 km || 
|-id=271 bgcolor=#E9E9E9
| 414271 ||  || — || April 27, 2008 || Kitt Peak || Spacewatch || — || align=right | 1.8 km || 
|-id=272 bgcolor=#E9E9E9
| 414272 ||  || — || March 29, 2008 || Kitt Peak || Spacewatch || — || align=right data-sort-value="0.83" | 830 m || 
|-id=273 bgcolor=#d6d6d6
| 414273 ||  || — || May 1, 2008 || Catalina || CSS || — || align=right | 4.8 km || 
|-id=274 bgcolor=#E9E9E9
| 414274 ||  || — || May 5, 2008 || Bergisch Gladbach || Bergisch Gladbach Obs. || — || align=right | 1.8 km || 
|-id=275 bgcolor=#C2FFFF
| 414275 ||  || — || May 5, 2008 || Kitt Peak || Spacewatch || L5 || align=right | 9.0 km || 
|-id=276 bgcolor=#d6d6d6
| 414276 ||  || — || May 1, 2008 || Siding Spring || SSS || — || align=right | 3.6 km || 
|-id=277 bgcolor=#E9E9E9
| 414277 ||  || — || May 15, 2008 || Kitt Peak || Spacewatch || — || align=right | 2.2 km || 
|-id=278 bgcolor=#E9E9E9
| 414278 ||  || — || May 3, 2008 || Kitt Peak || Spacewatch || — || align=right | 1.8 km || 
|-id=279 bgcolor=#fefefe
| 414279 ||  || — || May 29, 2008 || Mount Lemmon || Mount Lemmon Survey || H || align=right data-sort-value="0.68" | 680 m || 
|-id=280 bgcolor=#E9E9E9
| 414280 ||  || — || April 4, 2008 || Kitt Peak || Spacewatch || — || align=right | 1.6 km || 
|-id=281 bgcolor=#E9E9E9
| 414281 ||  || — || May 28, 2008 || Kitt Peak || Spacewatch || — || align=right | 2.1 km || 
|-id=282 bgcolor=#d6d6d6
| 414282 ||  || — || June 28, 2008 || Siding Spring || SSS || Tj (2.99) || align=right | 6.0 km || 
|-id=283 bgcolor=#d6d6d6
| 414283 ||  || — || June 30, 2008 || Vicques || M. Ory || — || align=right | 2.2 km || 
|-id=284 bgcolor=#d6d6d6
| 414284 ||  || — || June 29, 2008 || Siding Spring || SSS || — || align=right | 4.7 km || 
|-id=285 bgcolor=#fefefe
| 414285 || 2008 OY || — || July 26, 2008 || La Sagra || OAM Obs. || H || align=right data-sort-value="0.88" | 880 m || 
|-id=286 bgcolor=#FFC2E0
| 414286 ||  || — || July 29, 2008 || Mount Lemmon || Mount Lemmon Survey || ATEPHA || align=right data-sort-value="0.37" | 370 m || 
|-id=287 bgcolor=#FFC2E0
| 414287 ||  || — || July 29, 2008 || Mount Lemmon || Mount Lemmon Survey || APO +1kmPHAcritical || align=right | 2.0 km || 
|-id=288 bgcolor=#d6d6d6
| 414288 ||  || — || July 28, 2008 || La Sagra || OAM Obs. || — || align=right | 2.8 km || 
|-id=289 bgcolor=#d6d6d6
| 414289 ||  || — || August 5, 2008 || La Sagra || OAM Obs. || EOS || align=right | 2.4 km || 
|-id=290 bgcolor=#d6d6d6
| 414290 ||  || — || August 10, 2008 || La Sagra || OAM Obs. || — || align=right | 3.2 km || 
|-id=291 bgcolor=#d6d6d6
| 414291 ||  || — || August 10, 2008 || Črni Vrh || Črni Vrh || EUP || align=right | 4.6 km || 
|-id=292 bgcolor=#d6d6d6
| 414292 ||  || — || July 30, 2008 || Kitt Peak || Spacewatch || THB || align=right | 3.1 km || 
|-id=293 bgcolor=#d6d6d6
| 414293 ||  || — || August 25, 2008 || Dauban || F. Kugel || EOS || align=right | 2.3 km || 
|-id=294 bgcolor=#d6d6d6
| 414294 ||  || — || August 25, 2008 || La Sagra || OAM Obs. || — || align=right | 2.7 km || 
|-id=295 bgcolor=#d6d6d6
| 414295 ||  || — || July 29, 2008 || Mount Lemmon || Mount Lemmon Survey || — || align=right | 4.2 km || 
|-id=296 bgcolor=#d6d6d6
| 414296 ||  || — || August 23, 2008 || Siding Spring || SSS || — || align=right | 4.1 km || 
|-id=297 bgcolor=#d6d6d6
| 414297 ||  || — || August 26, 2008 || Črni Vrh || Črni Vrh || — || align=right | 3.0 km || 
|-id=298 bgcolor=#d6d6d6
| 414298 ||  || — || September 2, 2008 || Kitt Peak || Spacewatch || — || align=right | 4.7 km || 
|-id=299 bgcolor=#d6d6d6
| 414299 ||  || — || September 3, 2008 || Kitt Peak || Spacewatch || — || align=right | 2.7 km || 
|-id=300 bgcolor=#d6d6d6
| 414300 ||  || — || August 24, 2008 || Kitt Peak || Spacewatch || — || align=right | 3.2 km || 
|}

414301–414400 

|-bgcolor=#d6d6d6
| 414301 ||  || — || August 24, 2008 || Kitt Peak || Spacewatch || EOS || align=right | 1.8 km || 
|-id=302 bgcolor=#d6d6d6
| 414302 ||  || — || September 7, 2008 || Dauban || F. Kugel || — || align=right | 3.1 km || 
|-id=303 bgcolor=#d6d6d6
| 414303 ||  || — || September 2, 2008 || Kitt Peak || Spacewatch || — || align=right | 2.8 km || 
|-id=304 bgcolor=#d6d6d6
| 414304 ||  || — || September 2, 2008 || Kitt Peak || Spacewatch || — || align=right | 2.7 km || 
|-id=305 bgcolor=#d6d6d6
| 414305 ||  || — || September 2, 2008 || Kitt Peak || Spacewatch || (1118) || align=right | 4.8 km || 
|-id=306 bgcolor=#d6d6d6
| 414306 ||  || — || September 2, 2008 || Kitt Peak || Spacewatch || — || align=right | 3.9 km || 
|-id=307 bgcolor=#d6d6d6
| 414307 ||  || — || September 3, 2008 || Kitt Peak || Spacewatch || — || align=right | 2.9 km || 
|-id=308 bgcolor=#d6d6d6
| 414308 ||  || — || August 6, 2008 || Siding Spring || SSS || — || align=right | 2.8 km || 
|-id=309 bgcolor=#d6d6d6
| 414309 ||  || — || September 8, 2008 || Taunus || E. Schwab, R. Kling || — || align=right | 3.4 km || 
|-id=310 bgcolor=#d6d6d6
| 414310 ||  || — || September 5, 2008 || Kitt Peak || Spacewatch || LIX || align=right | 3.6 km || 
|-id=311 bgcolor=#d6d6d6
| 414311 ||  || — || September 5, 2008 || Kitt Peak || Spacewatch || — || align=right | 3.0 km || 
|-id=312 bgcolor=#d6d6d6
| 414312 ||  || — || September 2, 2008 || Kitt Peak || Spacewatch || — || align=right | 3.6 km || 
|-id=313 bgcolor=#d6d6d6
| 414313 ||  || — || September 2, 2008 || Kitt Peak || Spacewatch || THM || align=right | 2.4 km || 
|-id=314 bgcolor=#d6d6d6
| 414314 ||  || — || September 6, 2008 || Mount Lemmon || Mount Lemmon Survey || — || align=right | 3.0 km || 
|-id=315 bgcolor=#d6d6d6
| 414315 ||  || — || September 7, 2008 || Mount Lemmon || Mount Lemmon Survey || — || align=right | 2.6 km || 
|-id=316 bgcolor=#d6d6d6
| 414316 ||  || — || September 9, 2008 || Kitt Peak || Spacewatch || EOS || align=right | 1.9 km || 
|-id=317 bgcolor=#d6d6d6
| 414317 ||  || — || September 6, 2008 || Mount Lemmon || Mount Lemmon Survey || — || align=right | 2.1 km || 
|-id=318 bgcolor=#d6d6d6
| 414318 ||  || — || September 6, 2008 || Kitt Peak || Spacewatch || EOS || align=right | 1.5 km || 
|-id=319 bgcolor=#d6d6d6
| 414319 ||  || — || June 9, 2007 || Kitt Peak || Spacewatch || — || align=right | 3.1 km || 
|-id=320 bgcolor=#d6d6d6
| 414320 ||  || — || September 9, 2008 || Mount Lemmon || Mount Lemmon Survey || — || align=right | 3.0 km || 
|-id=321 bgcolor=#d6d6d6
| 414321 ||  || — || September 3, 2008 || La Sagra || OAM Obs. || EUP || align=right | 4.2 km || 
|-id=322 bgcolor=#d6d6d6
| 414322 ||  || — || September 6, 2008 || Mount Lemmon || Mount Lemmon Survey || THM || align=right | 1.9 km || 
|-id=323 bgcolor=#d6d6d6
| 414323 ||  || — || September 5, 2008 || Kitt Peak || Spacewatch ||  || align=right | 2.7 km || 
|-id=324 bgcolor=#d6d6d6
| 414324 ||  || — || August 21, 2008 || Kitt Peak || Spacewatch || — || align=right | 3.0 km || 
|-id=325 bgcolor=#d6d6d6
| 414325 ||  || — || September 3, 2008 || Kitt Peak || Spacewatch || EUP || align=right | 4.1 km || 
|-id=326 bgcolor=#d6d6d6
| 414326 ||  || — || September 19, 2008 || Kitt Peak || Spacewatch || — || align=right | 3.1 km || 
|-id=327 bgcolor=#d6d6d6
| 414327 ||  || — || September 21, 2008 || Mount Lemmon || Mount Lemmon Survey || — || align=right | 4.1 km || 
|-id=328 bgcolor=#d6d6d6
| 414328 ||  || — || September 23, 2008 || Mount Lemmon || Mount Lemmon Survey || — || align=right | 3.4 km || 
|-id=329 bgcolor=#d6d6d6
| 414329 ||  || — || September 21, 2008 || Kitt Peak || Spacewatch || — || align=right | 3.4 km || 
|-id=330 bgcolor=#d6d6d6
| 414330 ||  || — || September 21, 2008 || Kitt Peak || Spacewatch || — || align=right | 2.5 km || 
|-id=331 bgcolor=#d6d6d6
| 414331 ||  || — || September 22, 2008 || Kitt Peak || Spacewatch || — || align=right | 3.2 km || 
|-id=332 bgcolor=#d6d6d6
| 414332 ||  || — || October 29, 2003 || Kitt Peak || Spacewatch || — || align=right | 2.6 km || 
|-id=333 bgcolor=#d6d6d6
| 414333 ||  || — || September 29, 2008 || Dauban || F. Kugel || — || align=right | 5.0 km || 
|-id=334 bgcolor=#d6d6d6
| 414334 ||  || — || September 5, 2008 || Kitt Peak || Spacewatch || VER || align=right | 2.4 km || 
|-id=335 bgcolor=#d6d6d6
| 414335 ||  || — || September 25, 2008 || Kitt Peak || Spacewatch || — || align=right | 2.8 km || 
|-id=336 bgcolor=#d6d6d6
| 414336 ||  || — || September 6, 2008 || Kitt Peak || Spacewatch || — || align=right | 2.5 km || 
|-id=337 bgcolor=#d6d6d6
| 414337 ||  || — || September 29, 2008 || La Sagra || OAM Obs. || 7:4 || align=right | 4.7 km || 
|-id=338 bgcolor=#d6d6d6
| 414338 ||  || — || September 20, 2008 || Catalina || CSS || HYG || align=right | 3.3 km || 
|-id=339 bgcolor=#d6d6d6
| 414339 ||  || — || September 25, 2008 || Mount Lemmon || Mount Lemmon Survey || VER || align=right | 2.9 km || 
|-id=340 bgcolor=#d6d6d6
| 414340 ||  || — || September 29, 2008 || Mount Lemmon || Mount Lemmon Survey || — || align=right | 3.5 km || 
|-id=341 bgcolor=#d6d6d6
| 414341 ||  || — || September 20, 2008 || Kitt Peak || Spacewatch || THM || align=right | 2.2 km || 
|-id=342 bgcolor=#d6d6d6
| 414342 ||  || — || September 21, 2008 || Kitt Peak || Spacewatch || — || align=right | 2.7 km || 
|-id=343 bgcolor=#d6d6d6
| 414343 ||  || — || September 20, 2008 || Kitt Peak || Spacewatch || (1298) || align=right | 3.0 km || 
|-id=344 bgcolor=#d6d6d6
| 414344 ||  || — || September 28, 2008 || Catalina || CSS || — || align=right | 3.1 km || 
|-id=345 bgcolor=#d6d6d6
| 414345 ||  || — || September 23, 2008 || Catalina || CSS || — || align=right | 7.8 km || 
|-id=346 bgcolor=#d6d6d6
| 414346 ||  || — || September 23, 2008 || Kitt Peak || Spacewatch || — || align=right | 3.7 km || 
|-id=347 bgcolor=#d6d6d6
| 414347 ||  || — || September 24, 2008 || Mount Lemmon || Mount Lemmon Survey || Tj (2.99) || align=right | 3.1 km || 
|-id=348 bgcolor=#d6d6d6
| 414348 ||  || — || September 30, 2008 || Catalina || CSS || — || align=right | 2.9 km || 
|-id=349 bgcolor=#d6d6d6
| 414349 ||  || — || October 5, 2008 || La Sagra || OAM Obs. || VER || align=right | 3.2 km || 
|-id=350 bgcolor=#d6d6d6
| 414350 ||  || — || October 1, 2008 || Mount Lemmon || Mount Lemmon Survey || — || align=right | 4.9 km || 
|-id=351 bgcolor=#d6d6d6
| 414351 ||  || — || October 1, 2008 || Kitt Peak || Spacewatch || — || align=right | 2.9 km || 
|-id=352 bgcolor=#d6d6d6
| 414352 ||  || — || September 24, 2008 || Kitt Peak || Spacewatch || — || align=right | 2.7 km || 
|-id=353 bgcolor=#d6d6d6
| 414353 ||  || — || October 1, 2008 || Mount Lemmon || Mount Lemmon Survey || THM || align=right | 2.5 km || 
|-id=354 bgcolor=#d6d6d6
| 414354 ||  || — || September 7, 2008 || Mount Lemmon || Mount Lemmon Survey || — || align=right | 2.9 km || 
|-id=355 bgcolor=#d6d6d6
| 414355 ||  || — || September 24, 2008 || Kitt Peak || Spacewatch || VER || align=right | 2.2 km || 
|-id=356 bgcolor=#d6d6d6
| 414356 ||  || — || October 2, 2008 || Kitt Peak || Spacewatch || 7:4 || align=right | 5.4 km || 
|-id=357 bgcolor=#d6d6d6
| 414357 ||  || — || October 2, 2008 || Mount Lemmon || Mount Lemmon Survey || — || align=right | 3.5 km || 
|-id=358 bgcolor=#d6d6d6
| 414358 ||  || — || October 6, 2008 || Kitt Peak || Spacewatch || — || align=right | 3.4 km || 
|-id=359 bgcolor=#d6d6d6
| 414359 ||  || — || October 6, 2008 || Mount Lemmon || Mount Lemmon Survey || — || align=right | 3.2 km || 
|-id=360 bgcolor=#d6d6d6
| 414360 ||  || — || October 6, 2008 || Catalina || CSS || EUP || align=right | 4.5 km || 
|-id=361 bgcolor=#d6d6d6
| 414361 ||  || — || October 8, 2008 || Mount Lemmon || Mount Lemmon Survey || — || align=right | 3.8 km || 
|-id=362 bgcolor=#d6d6d6
| 414362 ||  || — || October 8, 2008 || Mount Lemmon || Mount Lemmon Survey || — || align=right | 3.9 km || 
|-id=363 bgcolor=#d6d6d6
| 414363 ||  || — || September 4, 2008 || Kitt Peak || Spacewatch || — || align=right | 2.8 km || 
|-id=364 bgcolor=#d6d6d6
| 414364 ||  || — || September 3, 2008 || Kitt Peak || Spacewatch || — || align=right | 2.9 km || 
|-id=365 bgcolor=#d6d6d6
| 414365 ||  || — || February 9, 1999 || Kitt Peak || Spacewatch || — || align=right | 3.0 km || 
|-id=366 bgcolor=#d6d6d6
| 414366 ||  || — || September 24, 2008 || Kitt Peak || Spacewatch || — || align=right | 2.8 km || 
|-id=367 bgcolor=#d6d6d6
| 414367 ||  || — || October 18, 2008 || Kitt Peak || Spacewatch || — || align=right | 3.4 km || 
|-id=368 bgcolor=#d6d6d6
| 414368 ||  || — || October 21, 2008 || Mount Lemmon || Mount Lemmon Survey || HYG || align=right | 2.8 km || 
|-id=369 bgcolor=#d6d6d6
| 414369 ||  || — || September 29, 2008 || Catalina || CSS || TIR || align=right | 3.7 km || 
|-id=370 bgcolor=#d6d6d6
| 414370 ||  || — || October 9, 2008 || Kitt Peak || Spacewatch || — || align=right | 3.3 km || 
|-id=371 bgcolor=#d6d6d6
| 414371 ||  || — || October 2, 2008 || Mount Lemmon || Mount Lemmon Survey || 7:4 || align=right | 3.8 km || 
|-id=372 bgcolor=#d6d6d6
| 414372 ||  || — || October 19, 2008 || Marly || P. Kocher || TIR || align=right | 3.3 km || 
|-id=373 bgcolor=#d6d6d6
| 414373 ||  || — || October 9, 2008 || Kitt Peak || Spacewatch || — || align=right | 2.8 km || 
|-id=374 bgcolor=#d6d6d6
| 414374 ||  || — || October 27, 2008 || Mount Lemmon || Mount Lemmon Survey || — || align=right | 5.4 km || 
|-id=375 bgcolor=#d6d6d6
| 414375 ||  || — || October 27, 2008 || Kitt Peak || Spacewatch || HYG || align=right | 3.1 km || 
|-id=376 bgcolor=#d6d6d6
| 414376 ||  || — || October 27, 2008 || Mount Lemmon || Mount Lemmon Survey || EUP || align=right | 4.7 km || 
|-id=377 bgcolor=#d6d6d6
| 414377 ||  || — || October 22, 2008 || Kitt Peak || Spacewatch || — || align=right | 4.0 km || 
|-id=378 bgcolor=#d6d6d6
| 414378 ||  || — || October 8, 2008 || Mount Lemmon || Mount Lemmon Survey || — || align=right | 3.6 km || 
|-id=379 bgcolor=#fefefe
| 414379 ||  || — || October 21, 2008 || Kitt Peak || Spacewatch || — || align=right data-sort-value="0.64" | 640 m || 
|-id=380 bgcolor=#fefefe
| 414380 ||  || — || October 24, 2008 || Mount Lemmon || Mount Lemmon Survey || — || align=right data-sort-value="0.67" | 670 m || 
|-id=381 bgcolor=#d6d6d6
| 414381 ||  || — || October 9, 2008 || Mount Lemmon || Mount Lemmon Survey || — || align=right | 3.0 km || 
|-id=382 bgcolor=#d6d6d6
| 414382 ||  || — || September 27, 2008 || Catalina || CSS || — || align=right | 4.8 km || 
|-id=383 bgcolor=#d6d6d6
| 414383 ||  || — || October 26, 2008 || Mount Lemmon || Mount Lemmon Survey || 7:4 || align=right | 4.3 km || 
|-id=384 bgcolor=#d6d6d6
| 414384 ||  || — || November 1, 2008 || Mount Lemmon || Mount Lemmon Survey || 7:4 || align=right | 5.5 km || 
|-id=385 bgcolor=#d6d6d6
| 414385 ||  || — || September 22, 2008 || Mount Lemmon || Mount Lemmon Survey || — || align=right | 2.9 km || 
|-id=386 bgcolor=#d6d6d6
| 414386 ||  || — || October 10, 2008 || Mount Lemmon || Mount Lemmon Survey || — || align=right | 4.0 km || 
|-id=387 bgcolor=#fefefe
| 414387 ||  || — || October 31, 2008 || Mount Lemmon || Mount Lemmon Survey || — || align=right data-sort-value="0.97" | 970 m || 
|-id=388 bgcolor=#fefefe
| 414388 ||  || — || November 21, 2008 || Kitt Peak || Spacewatch || — || align=right data-sort-value="0.53" | 530 m || 
|-id=389 bgcolor=#d6d6d6
| 414389 ||  || — || December 2, 2008 || Socorro || LINEAR || — || align=right | 4.4 km || 
|-id=390 bgcolor=#fefefe
| 414390 ||  || — || December 29, 2008 || Mount Lemmon || Mount Lemmon Survey || — || align=right data-sort-value="0.76" | 760 m || 
|-id=391 bgcolor=#fefefe
| 414391 ||  || — || December 29, 2008 || Mount Lemmon || Mount Lemmon Survey || — || align=right | 1.1 km || 
|-id=392 bgcolor=#fefefe
| 414392 ||  || — || January 23, 2006 || Kitt Peak || Spacewatch || — || align=right data-sort-value="0.68" | 680 m || 
|-id=393 bgcolor=#fefefe
| 414393 ||  || — || December 21, 2008 || Kitt Peak || Spacewatch || — || align=right data-sort-value="0.50" | 500 m || 
|-id=394 bgcolor=#fefefe
| 414394 ||  || — || December 21, 2008 || Mount Lemmon || Mount Lemmon Survey || — || align=right data-sort-value="0.73" | 730 m || 
|-id=395 bgcolor=#fefefe
| 414395 ||  || — || January 15, 2009 || Kitt Peak || Spacewatch || — || align=right data-sort-value="0.91" | 910 m || 
|-id=396 bgcolor=#fefefe
| 414396 ||  || — || January 15, 2009 || Kitt Peak || Spacewatch || V || align=right data-sort-value="0.61" | 610 m || 
|-id=397 bgcolor=#fefefe
| 414397 ||  || — || January 3, 2009 || Mount Lemmon || Mount Lemmon Survey || — || align=right data-sort-value="0.69" | 690 m || 
|-id=398 bgcolor=#d6d6d6
| 414398 ||  || — || January 7, 2009 || Kitt Peak || Spacewatch || EOS || align=right | 2.8 km || 
|-id=399 bgcolor=#fefefe
| 414399 ||  || — || November 8, 2008 || Mount Lemmon || Mount Lemmon Survey || — || align=right data-sort-value="0.73" | 730 m || 
|-id=400 bgcolor=#fefefe
| 414400 ||  || — || January 16, 2009 || Kitt Peak || Spacewatch || — || align=right data-sort-value="0.60" | 600 m || 
|}

414401–414500 

|-bgcolor=#fefefe
| 414401 ||  || — || April 30, 2006 || Catalina || CSS || — || align=right data-sort-value="0.86" | 860 m || 
|-id=402 bgcolor=#fefefe
| 414402 ||  || — || May 7, 2006 || Mount Lemmon || Mount Lemmon Survey || — || align=right data-sort-value="0.79" | 790 m || 
|-id=403 bgcolor=#fefefe
| 414403 ||  || — || January 16, 2009 || Kitt Peak || Spacewatch || — || align=right data-sort-value="0.69" | 690 m || 
|-id=404 bgcolor=#fefefe
| 414404 ||  || — || January 16, 2009 || Kitt Peak || Spacewatch || — || align=right data-sort-value="0.87" | 870 m || 
|-id=405 bgcolor=#fefefe
| 414405 ||  || — || January 25, 2009 || Kitt Peak || Spacewatch || — || align=right data-sort-value="0.82" | 820 m || 
|-id=406 bgcolor=#fefefe
| 414406 ||  || — || January 18, 2009 || Kitt Peak || Spacewatch || — || align=right data-sort-value="0.80" | 800 m || 
|-id=407 bgcolor=#fefefe
| 414407 ||  || — || January 25, 2009 || Kitt Peak || Spacewatch || — || align=right data-sort-value="0.87" | 870 m || 
|-id=408 bgcolor=#fefefe
| 414408 ||  || — || January 29, 2009 || Kitt Peak || Spacewatch || — || align=right data-sort-value="0.68" | 680 m || 
|-id=409 bgcolor=#fefefe
| 414409 ||  || — || January 31, 2009 || Mount Lemmon || Mount Lemmon Survey || — || align=right data-sort-value="0.96" | 960 m || 
|-id=410 bgcolor=#fefefe
| 414410 ||  || — || January 27, 2009 || Purple Mountain || PMO NEO || — || align=right | 1.00 km || 
|-id=411 bgcolor=#fefefe
| 414411 ||  || — || January 31, 2009 || Mount Lemmon || Mount Lemmon Survey || — || align=right data-sort-value="0.66" | 660 m || 
|-id=412 bgcolor=#fefefe
| 414412 ||  || — || January 31, 2009 || Kitt Peak || Spacewatch || V || align=right data-sort-value="0.61" | 610 m || 
|-id=413 bgcolor=#fefefe
| 414413 ||  || — || January 27, 2009 || Purple Mountain || PMO NEO || — || align=right data-sort-value="0.95" | 950 m || 
|-id=414 bgcolor=#fefefe
| 414414 ||  || — || January 29, 2009 || Mount Lemmon || Mount Lemmon Survey || — || align=right data-sort-value="0.82" | 820 m || 
|-id=415 bgcolor=#fefefe
| 414415 ||  || — || January 20, 2009 || Mount Lemmon || Mount Lemmon Survey || — || align=right data-sort-value="0.63" | 630 m || 
|-id=416 bgcolor=#fefefe
| 414416 ||  || — || February 1, 2009 || Mount Lemmon || Mount Lemmon Survey || — || align=right data-sort-value="0.72" | 720 m || 
|-id=417 bgcolor=#fefefe
| 414417 ||  || — || February 1, 2009 || Kitt Peak || Spacewatch || — || align=right data-sort-value="0.89" | 890 m || 
|-id=418 bgcolor=#fefefe
| 414418 ||  || — || February 1, 2009 || Kitt Peak || Spacewatch || — || align=right data-sort-value="0.69" | 690 m || 
|-id=419 bgcolor=#fefefe
| 414419 ||  || — || February 2, 2009 || Mount Lemmon || Mount Lemmon Survey || — || align=right data-sort-value="0.75" | 750 m || 
|-id=420 bgcolor=#fefefe
| 414420 ||  || — || January 17, 2009 || Kitt Peak || Spacewatch || — || align=right data-sort-value="0.82" | 820 m || 
|-id=421 bgcolor=#fefefe
| 414421 ||  || — || February 4, 2009 || Mount Lemmon || Mount Lemmon Survey || MAS || align=right data-sort-value="0.59" | 590 m || 
|-id=422 bgcolor=#fefefe
| 414422 ||  || — || February 16, 2009 || Dauban || F. Kugel || — || align=right data-sort-value="0.58" | 580 m || 
|-id=423 bgcolor=#fefefe
| 414423 ||  || — || February 19, 2009 || Catalina || CSS || — || align=right data-sort-value="0.72" | 720 m || 
|-id=424 bgcolor=#fefefe
| 414424 ||  || — || February 19, 2009 || Mount Lemmon || Mount Lemmon Survey || — || align=right data-sort-value="0.82" | 820 m || 
|-id=425 bgcolor=#fefefe
| 414425 ||  || — || February 19, 2009 || Mount Lemmon || Mount Lemmon Survey || — || align=right data-sort-value="0.79" | 790 m || 
|-id=426 bgcolor=#fefefe
| 414426 ||  || — || February 20, 2009 || Kitt Peak || Spacewatch || — || align=right data-sort-value="0.95" | 950 m || 
|-id=427 bgcolor=#fefefe
| 414427 ||  || — || February 23, 2009 || Calar Alto || F. Hormuth || — || align=right data-sort-value="0.75" | 750 m || 
|-id=428 bgcolor=#fefefe
| 414428 ||  || — || February 21, 2009 || Kitt Peak || Spacewatch || MAS || align=right data-sort-value="0.79" | 790 m || 
|-id=429 bgcolor=#FFC2E0
| 414429 ||  || — || February 26, 2009 || Catalina || CSS || APO +1km || align=right | 2.9 km || 
|-id=430 bgcolor=#fefefe
| 414430 ||  || — || February 22, 2009 || Kitt Peak || Spacewatch || — || align=right data-sort-value="0.75" | 750 m || 
|-id=431 bgcolor=#fefefe
| 414431 ||  || — || February 19, 2009 || La Sagra || OAM Obs. || — || align=right data-sort-value="0.87" | 870 m || 
|-id=432 bgcolor=#fefefe
| 414432 ||  || — || February 26, 2009 || Catalina || CSS || NYS || align=right data-sort-value="0.79" | 790 m || 
|-id=433 bgcolor=#fefefe
| 414433 ||  || — || February 22, 2009 || Mount Lemmon || Mount Lemmon Survey || — || align=right data-sort-value="0.92" | 920 m || 
|-id=434 bgcolor=#fefefe
| 414434 ||  || — || October 8, 2007 || Mount Lemmon || Mount Lemmon Survey || — || align=right data-sort-value="0.87" | 870 m || 
|-id=435 bgcolor=#fefefe
| 414435 ||  || — || February 26, 2009 || Catalina || CSS || — || align=right data-sort-value="0.72" | 720 m || 
|-id=436 bgcolor=#fefefe
| 414436 ||  || — || February 27, 2009 || Kitt Peak || Spacewatch || — || align=right data-sort-value="0.72" | 720 m || 
|-id=437 bgcolor=#fefefe
| 414437 ||  || — || February 27, 2009 || Kitt Peak || Spacewatch || V || align=right data-sort-value="0.62" | 620 m || 
|-id=438 bgcolor=#E9E9E9
| 414438 ||  || — || March 10, 2005 || Mount Lemmon || Mount Lemmon Survey || — || align=right data-sort-value="0.79" | 790 m || 
|-id=439 bgcolor=#fefefe
| 414439 ||  || — || February 19, 2009 || Kitt Peak || Spacewatch || — || align=right data-sort-value="0.67" | 670 m || 
|-id=440 bgcolor=#fefefe
| 414440 ||  || — || February 20, 2009 || Mount Lemmon || Mount Lemmon Survey || — || align=right data-sort-value="0.89" | 890 m || 
|-id=441 bgcolor=#fefefe
| 414441 ||  || — || February 20, 2009 || Kitt Peak || Spacewatch || — || align=right data-sort-value="0.64" | 640 m || 
|-id=442 bgcolor=#fefefe
| 414442 ||  || — || March 15, 2009 || La Sagra || OAM Obs. || — || align=right data-sort-value="0.92" | 920 m || 
|-id=443 bgcolor=#fefefe
| 414443 ||  || — || March 15, 2009 || Kitt Peak || Spacewatch || NYS || align=right data-sort-value="0.56" | 560 m || 
|-id=444 bgcolor=#fefefe
| 414444 ||  || — || March 17, 2009 || Taunus || E. Schwab, R. Kling || — || align=right data-sort-value="0.74" | 740 m || 
|-id=445 bgcolor=#fefefe
| 414445 ||  || — || March 21, 2009 || Mount Lemmon || Mount Lemmon Survey || — || align=right data-sort-value="0.89" | 890 m || 
|-id=446 bgcolor=#fefefe
| 414446 ||  || — || March 22, 2009 || Catalina || CSS || — || align=right | 1.0 km || 
|-id=447 bgcolor=#fefefe
| 414447 ||  || — || October 10, 2007 || Mount Lemmon || Mount Lemmon Survey || — || align=right data-sort-value="0.96" | 960 m || 
|-id=448 bgcolor=#fefefe
| 414448 ||  || — || March 17, 2009 || Kitt Peak || Spacewatch || — || align=right data-sort-value="0.67" | 670 m || 
|-id=449 bgcolor=#fefefe
| 414449 ||  || — || October 20, 2007 || Kitt Peak || Spacewatch || — || align=right data-sort-value="0.68" | 680 m || 
|-id=450 bgcolor=#fefefe
| 414450 ||  || — || March 23, 2009 || Calar Alto || F. Hormuth || — || align=right data-sort-value="0.78" | 780 m || 
|-id=451 bgcolor=#fefefe
| 414451 ||  || — || March 29, 2009 || Kitt Peak || Spacewatch || — || align=right data-sort-value="0.86" | 860 m || 
|-id=452 bgcolor=#fefefe
| 414452 || 2009 GS || — || April 3, 2009 || Mayhill || A. Lowe || — || align=right data-sort-value="0.82" | 820 m || 
|-id=453 bgcolor=#fefefe
| 414453 ||  || — || April 17, 2009 || Kitt Peak || Spacewatch || — || align=right data-sort-value="0.79" | 790 m || 
|-id=454 bgcolor=#fefefe
| 414454 ||  || — || April 17, 2009 || Kitt Peak || Spacewatch || — || align=right data-sort-value="0.82" | 820 m || 
|-id=455 bgcolor=#fefefe
| 414455 ||  || — || April 18, 2009 || Kitt Peak || Spacewatch || — || align=right data-sort-value="0.74" | 740 m || 
|-id=456 bgcolor=#fefefe
| 414456 ||  || — || October 14, 2007 || Mount Lemmon || Mount Lemmon Survey || V || align=right data-sort-value="0.62" | 620 m || 
|-id=457 bgcolor=#fefefe
| 414457 ||  || — || April 19, 2009 || Kitt Peak || Spacewatch || — || align=right data-sort-value="0.85" | 850 m || 
|-id=458 bgcolor=#fefefe
| 414458 ||  || — || April 18, 2009 || Kitt Peak || Spacewatch || — || align=right data-sort-value="0.92" | 920 m || 
|-id=459 bgcolor=#fefefe
| 414459 ||  || — || April 20, 2009 || Mount Lemmon || Mount Lemmon Survey || — || align=right data-sort-value="0.69" | 690 m || 
|-id=460 bgcolor=#fefefe
| 414460 ||  || — || April 17, 2009 || Catalina || CSS || — || align=right | 1.1 km || 
|-id=461 bgcolor=#fefefe
| 414461 ||  || — || April 21, 2009 || La Sagra || OAM Obs. || — || align=right | 1.0 km || 
|-id=462 bgcolor=#fefefe
| 414462 ||  || — || April 22, 2009 || La Sagra || OAM Obs. || (5026) || align=right data-sort-value="0.83" | 830 m || 
|-id=463 bgcolor=#fefefe
| 414463 ||  || — || April 21, 2009 || Kitt Peak || Spacewatch || — || align=right data-sort-value="0.95" | 950 m || 
|-id=464 bgcolor=#fefefe
| 414464 ||  || — || April 26, 2009 || Kitt Peak || Spacewatch || — || align=right data-sort-value="0.72" | 720 m || 
|-id=465 bgcolor=#E9E9E9
| 414465 ||  || — || April 29, 2009 || Siding Spring || SSS || — || align=right | 1.3 km || 
|-id=466 bgcolor=#fefefe
| 414466 ||  || — || May 21, 2009 || Cerro Burek || Alianza S4 Obs. || MAS || align=right data-sort-value="0.79" | 790 m || 
|-id=467 bgcolor=#fefefe
| 414467 ||  || — || May 26, 2009 || Kitt Peak || Spacewatch || — || align=right | 1.0 km || 
|-id=468 bgcolor=#C2FFFF
| 414468 ||  || — || January 5, 2006 || Mount Lemmon || Mount Lemmon Survey || L5 || align=right | 12 km || 
|-id=469 bgcolor=#fefefe
| 414469 ||  || — || May 27, 2009 || Kitt Peak || Spacewatch || V || align=right data-sort-value="0.60" | 600 m || 
|-id=470 bgcolor=#E9E9E9
| 414470 ||  || — || October 25, 2005 || Socorro || LINEAR || — || align=right | 3.2 km || 
|-id=471 bgcolor=#E9E9E9
| 414471 ||  || — || July 19, 2009 || La Sagra || OAM Obs. || — || align=right | 2.3 km || 
|-id=472 bgcolor=#E9E9E9
| 414472 ||  || — || June 22, 2009 || Mount Lemmon || Mount Lemmon Survey || — || align=right | 1.8 km || 
|-id=473 bgcolor=#E9E9E9
| 414473 ||  || — || July 20, 2009 || La Sagra || OAM Obs. || — || align=right | 1.1 km || 
|-id=474 bgcolor=#E9E9E9
| 414474 ||  || — || July 27, 2009 || Kitt Peak || Spacewatch || — || align=right | 1.7 km || 
|-id=475 bgcolor=#E9E9E9
| 414475 ||  || — || July 31, 2009 || Catalina || CSS || — || align=right | 3.7 km || 
|-id=476 bgcolor=#E9E9E9
| 414476 ||  || — || July 28, 2009 || Kitt Peak || Spacewatch || — || align=right | 1.8 km || 
|-id=477 bgcolor=#E9E9E9
| 414477 ||  || — || August 12, 2009 || La Sagra || OAM Obs. || — || align=right | 3.1 km || 
|-id=478 bgcolor=#E9E9E9
| 414478 ||  || — || July 18, 2009 || Siding Spring || SSS || EUN || align=right | 1.5 km || 
|-id=479 bgcolor=#E9E9E9
| 414479 ||  || — || August 15, 2009 || Kitt Peak || Spacewatch || — || align=right | 2.4 km || 
|-id=480 bgcolor=#E9E9E9
| 414480 ||  || — || August 15, 2009 || Kitt Peak || Spacewatch || — || align=right | 2.9 km || 
|-id=481 bgcolor=#E9E9E9
| 414481 ||  || — || April 5, 2008 || Kitt Peak || Spacewatch || — || align=right | 2.3 km || 
|-id=482 bgcolor=#E9E9E9
| 414482 ||  || — || August 16, 2009 || Kitt Peak || Spacewatch || — || align=right | 2.0 km || 
|-id=483 bgcolor=#E9E9E9
| 414483 ||  || — || August 16, 2009 || Kitt Peak || Spacewatch || — || align=right | 2.9 km || 
|-id=484 bgcolor=#E9E9E9
| 414484 ||  || — || November 6, 2005 || Kitt Peak || Spacewatch || critical || align=right | 1.5 km || 
|-id=485 bgcolor=#E9E9E9
| 414485 ||  || — || October 24, 2005 || Kitt Peak || Spacewatch || — || align=right | 1.9 km || 
|-id=486 bgcolor=#E9E9E9
| 414486 ||  || — || August 18, 2009 || Catalina || CSS || — || align=right | 2.9 km || 
|-id=487 bgcolor=#d6d6d6
| 414487 ||  || — || August 28, 2009 || Kitt Peak || Spacewatch || — || align=right | 2.0 km || 
|-id=488 bgcolor=#E9E9E9
| 414488 ||  || — || August 17, 2009 || Kitt Peak || Spacewatch ||  || align=right | 3.0 km || 
|-id=489 bgcolor=#E9E9E9
| 414489 ||  || — || February 7, 2002 || Kitt Peak || Spacewatch || AGN || align=right | 1.5 km || 
|-id=490 bgcolor=#E9E9E9
| 414490 ||  || — || August 16, 2009 || Catalina || CSS || — || align=right | 2.3 km || 
|-id=491 bgcolor=#E9E9E9
| 414491 ||  || — || September 13, 2009 || Bisei SG Center || BATTeRS || DOR || align=right | 2.4 km || 
|-id=492 bgcolor=#E9E9E9
| 414492 ||  || — || September 10, 2009 || La Sagra || OAM Obs. || — || align=right | 2.4 km || 
|-id=493 bgcolor=#E9E9E9
| 414493 ||  || — || September 12, 2009 || Kitt Peak || Spacewatch || DOR || align=right | 2.4 km || 
|-id=494 bgcolor=#d6d6d6
| 414494 ||  || — || September 12, 2009 || Kitt Peak || Spacewatch || KOR || align=right | 1.2 km || 
|-id=495 bgcolor=#E9E9E9
| 414495 ||  || — || September 12, 2009 || Kitt Peak || Spacewatch || — || align=right | 2.7 km || 
|-id=496 bgcolor=#E9E9E9
| 414496 ||  || — || March 26, 2007 || Kitt Peak || Spacewatch || HOF || align=right | 3.2 km || 
|-id=497 bgcolor=#E9E9E9
| 414497 ||  || — || August 1, 2009 || Kitt Peak || Spacewatch || HNS || align=right | 1.1 km || 
|-id=498 bgcolor=#d6d6d6
| 414498 ||  || — || September 15, 2009 || Kitt Peak || Spacewatch || KOR || align=right | 1.1 km || 
|-id=499 bgcolor=#d6d6d6
| 414499 ||  || — || September 15, 2009 || Kitt Peak || Spacewatch || KOR || align=right | 1.2 km || 
|-id=500 bgcolor=#FA8072
| 414500 ||  || — || September 15, 2009 || Catalina || CSS || H || align=right data-sort-value="0.60" | 600 m || 
|}

414501–414600 

|-bgcolor=#E9E9E9
| 414501 ||  || — || August 17, 2009 || Catalina || CSS || — || align=right | 3.1 km || 
|-id=502 bgcolor=#C2FFFF
| 414502 ||  || — || April 2, 2009 || Mount Lemmon || Mount Lemmon Survey || L5 || align=right | 11 km || 
|-id=503 bgcolor=#d6d6d6
| 414503 ||  || — || September 16, 2009 || Mount Lemmon || Mount Lemmon Survey || — || align=right | 2.3 km || 
|-id=504 bgcolor=#E9E9E9
| 414504 ||  || — || August 20, 2009 || Kitt Peak || Spacewatch || HOF || align=right | 2.1 km || 
|-id=505 bgcolor=#E9E9E9
| 414505 ||  || — || February 17, 2007 || Mount Lemmon || Mount Lemmon Survey || — || align=right | 2.2 km || 
|-id=506 bgcolor=#d6d6d6
| 414506 ||  || — || September 18, 2009 || Bisei SG Center || BATTeRS || — || align=right | 2.2 km || 
|-id=507 bgcolor=#E9E9E9
| 414507 ||  || — || September 20, 2009 || Mayhill || A. Lowe || — || align=right | 2.8 km || 
|-id=508 bgcolor=#E9E9E9
| 414508 ||  || — || March 10, 2007 || Mount Lemmon || Mount Lemmon Survey || AGN || align=right | 1.1 km || 
|-id=509 bgcolor=#E9E9E9
| 414509 ||  || — || September 24, 2009 || Catalina || CSS || Tj (2.92) || align=right | 4.5 km || 
|-id=510 bgcolor=#E9E9E9
| 414510 ||  || — || September 16, 2009 || Kitt Peak || Spacewatch || GEF || align=right | 1.5 km || 
|-id=511 bgcolor=#E9E9E9
| 414511 ||  || — || September 16, 2009 || Kitt Peak || Spacewatch || AGN || align=right | 1.2 km || 
|-id=512 bgcolor=#d6d6d6
| 414512 ||  || — || September 16, 2009 || Kitt Peak || Spacewatch || KOR || align=right | 1.3 km || 
|-id=513 bgcolor=#d6d6d6
| 414513 ||  || — || September 16, 2009 || Kitt Peak || Spacewatch || KOR || align=right | 1.3 km || 
|-id=514 bgcolor=#d6d6d6
| 414514 ||  || — || September 16, 2009 || Kitt Peak || Spacewatch || — || align=right | 2.9 km || 
|-id=515 bgcolor=#d6d6d6
| 414515 ||  || — || September 16, 2009 || Kitt Peak || Spacewatch || EOS || align=right | 1.6 km || 
|-id=516 bgcolor=#d6d6d6
| 414516 ||  || — || September 16, 2009 || Kitt Peak || Spacewatch || KOR || align=right | 1.2 km || 
|-id=517 bgcolor=#E9E9E9
| 414517 ||  || — || September 16, 2009 || Mount Lemmon || Mount Lemmon Survey || — || align=right | 1.7 km || 
|-id=518 bgcolor=#d6d6d6
| 414518 ||  || — || September 16, 2009 || Kitt Peak || Spacewatch || — || align=right | 2.8 km || 
|-id=519 bgcolor=#d6d6d6
| 414519 ||  || — || September 17, 2009 || Kitt Peak || Spacewatch || — || align=right | 2.1 km || 
|-id=520 bgcolor=#E9E9E9
| 414520 ||  || — || September 17, 2009 || Catalina || CSS || — || align=right | 2.2 km || 
|-id=521 bgcolor=#d6d6d6
| 414521 ||  || — || September 17, 2009 || Kitt Peak || Spacewatch || — || align=right | 2.9 km || 
|-id=522 bgcolor=#d6d6d6
| 414522 ||  || — || September 17, 2009 || Kitt Peak || Spacewatch || EOS || align=right | 1.7 km || 
|-id=523 bgcolor=#d6d6d6
| 414523 ||  || — || September 17, 2009 || Kitt Peak || Spacewatch || — || align=right | 2.2 km || 
|-id=524 bgcolor=#E9E9E9
| 414524 ||  || — || September 17, 2009 || Mount Lemmon || Mount Lemmon Survey || — || align=right | 1.9 km || 
|-id=525 bgcolor=#E9E9E9
| 414525 ||  || — || September 17, 2009 || Kitt Peak || Spacewatch || — || align=right | 1.7 km || 
|-id=526 bgcolor=#E9E9E9
| 414526 ||  || — || October 25, 2005 || Mount Lemmon || Mount Lemmon Survey || — || align=right | 3.1 km || 
|-id=527 bgcolor=#E9E9E9
| 414527 ||  || — || August 20, 2009 || Kitt Peak || Spacewatch || — || align=right | 2.1 km || 
|-id=528 bgcolor=#E9E9E9
| 414528 ||  || — || September 18, 2009 || Mount Lemmon || Mount Lemmon Survey || — || align=right | 2.3 km || 
|-id=529 bgcolor=#d6d6d6
| 414529 ||  || — || September 19, 2009 || XuYi || PMO NEO || EOS || align=right | 2.6 km || 
|-id=530 bgcolor=#E9E9E9
| 414530 ||  || — || September 22, 2009 || Dauban || F. Kugel || — || align=right | 3.4 km || 
|-id=531 bgcolor=#d6d6d6
| 414531 ||  || — || September 20, 2009 || Kitt Peak || Spacewatch || — || align=right | 2.2 km || 
|-id=532 bgcolor=#FFC2E0
| 414532 ||  || — || September 25, 2009 || Socorro || LINEAR || AMO +1km || align=right | 1.6 km || 
|-id=533 bgcolor=#E9E9E9
| 414533 ||  || — || September 18, 2009 || Kitt Peak || Spacewatch || — || align=right | 2.1 km || 
|-id=534 bgcolor=#E9E9E9
| 414534 ||  || — || September 18, 2009 || Kitt Peak || Spacewatch || — || align=right | 2.4 km || 
|-id=535 bgcolor=#d6d6d6
| 414535 ||  || — || September 18, 2009 || Kitt Peak || Spacewatch || — || align=right | 2.2 km || 
|-id=536 bgcolor=#d6d6d6
| 414536 ||  || — || September 18, 2009 || Kitt Peak || Spacewatch || KOR || align=right | 1.1 km || 
|-id=537 bgcolor=#d6d6d6
| 414537 ||  || — || September 18, 2009 || Kitt Peak || Spacewatch || — || align=right | 3.6 km || 
|-id=538 bgcolor=#E9E9E9
| 414538 ||  || — || October 25, 2005 || Mount Lemmon || Mount Lemmon Survey || AST || align=right | 1.6 km || 
|-id=539 bgcolor=#d6d6d6
| 414539 ||  || — || October 3, 1999 || Kitt Peak || Spacewatch || KOR || align=right | 1.9 km || 
|-id=540 bgcolor=#d6d6d6
| 414540 ||  || — || September 20, 2009 || Kitt Peak || Spacewatch || — || align=right | 1.9 km || 
|-id=541 bgcolor=#d6d6d6
| 414541 ||  || — || April 10, 2003 || Kitt Peak || Spacewatch || — || align=right | 2.5 km || 
|-id=542 bgcolor=#E9E9E9
| 414542 ||  || — || September 12, 2009 || Kitt Peak || Spacewatch || — || align=right | 2.7 km || 
|-id=543 bgcolor=#d6d6d6
| 414543 ||  || — || September 20, 2009 || Kitt Peak || Spacewatch || — || align=right | 2.0 km || 
|-id=544 bgcolor=#E9E9E9
| 414544 ||  || — || September 22, 2009 || Kitt Peak || Spacewatch || — || align=right | 2.0 km || 
|-id=545 bgcolor=#E9E9E9
| 414545 ||  || — || February 26, 2007 || Mount Lemmon || Mount Lemmon Survey || — || align=right | 2.4 km || 
|-id=546 bgcolor=#E9E9E9
| 414546 ||  || — || August 28, 2009 || Kitt Peak || Spacewatch || — || align=right | 2.6 km || 
|-id=547 bgcolor=#d6d6d6
| 414547 ||  || — || September 21, 2009 || Kitt Peak || Spacewatch || — || align=right | 3.1 km || 
|-id=548 bgcolor=#E9E9E9
| 414548 ||  || — || December 3, 2005 || Kitt Peak || Spacewatch || GEF || align=right | 1.8 km || 
|-id=549 bgcolor=#d6d6d6
| 414549 ||  || — || December 4, 2005 || Kitt Peak || Spacewatch || — || align=right | 2.1 km || 
|-id=550 bgcolor=#d6d6d6
| 414550 ||  || — || September 24, 2009 || Kitt Peak || Spacewatch || 615 || align=right | 1.1 km || 
|-id=551 bgcolor=#E9E9E9
| 414551 ||  || — || September 24, 2009 || Mount Lemmon || Mount Lemmon Survey || DOR || align=right | 1.9 km || 
|-id=552 bgcolor=#d6d6d6
| 414552 ||  || — || September 17, 2009 || Catalina || CSS || — || align=right | 2.1 km || 
|-id=553 bgcolor=#d6d6d6
| 414553 ||  || — || September 18, 2009 || Catalina || CSS || LUT || align=right | 4.8 km || 
|-id=554 bgcolor=#E9E9E9
| 414554 ||  || — || August 16, 2009 || Kitt Peak || Spacewatch || — || align=right | 1.9 km || 
|-id=555 bgcolor=#E9E9E9
| 414555 ||  || — || September 18, 1995 || Kitt Peak || Spacewatch || — || align=right | 2.2 km || 
|-id=556 bgcolor=#d6d6d6
| 414556 ||  || — || September 23, 2009 || Mount Lemmon || Mount Lemmon Survey || — || align=right | 2.8 km || 
|-id=557 bgcolor=#d6d6d6
| 414557 ||  || — || September 25, 2009 || Kitt Peak || Spacewatch || — || align=right | 2.5 km || 
|-id=558 bgcolor=#d6d6d6
| 414558 ||  || — || September 25, 2009 || Kitt Peak || Spacewatch || — || align=right | 2.9 km || 
|-id=559 bgcolor=#E9E9E9
| 414559 ||  || — || September 17, 2009 || Kitt Peak || Spacewatch || — || align=right | 2.2 km || 
|-id=560 bgcolor=#E9E9E9
| 414560 ||  || — || September 27, 2009 || Mount Lemmon || Mount Lemmon Survey || — || align=right | 2.2 km || 
|-id=561 bgcolor=#d6d6d6
| 414561 ||  || — || September 17, 2009 || Kitt Peak || Spacewatch || 615 || align=right | 2.0 km || 
|-id=562 bgcolor=#d6d6d6
| 414562 ||  || — || March 20, 2007 || Kitt Peak || Spacewatch || — || align=right | 2.8 km || 
|-id=563 bgcolor=#E9E9E9
| 414563 ||  || — || September 16, 2009 || Kitt Peak || Spacewatch || — || align=right | 2.0 km || 
|-id=564 bgcolor=#E9E9E9
| 414564 ||  || — || January 17, 2007 || Kitt Peak || Spacewatch || — || align=right | 2.9 km || 
|-id=565 bgcolor=#E9E9E9
| 414565 ||  || — || August 18, 2009 || Kitt Peak || Spacewatch || — || align=right | 2.5 km || 
|-id=566 bgcolor=#E9E9E9
| 414566 ||  || — || September 21, 2009 || Catalina || CSS ||  || align=right | 2.6 km || 
|-id=567 bgcolor=#d6d6d6
| 414567 ||  || — || September 14, 2009 || Kitt Peak || Spacewatch || — || align=right | 3.8 km || 
|-id=568 bgcolor=#fefefe
| 414568 ||  || — || September 27, 2009 || Mount Lemmon || Mount Lemmon Survey || H || align=right data-sort-value="0.75" | 750 m || 
|-id=569 bgcolor=#E9E9E9
| 414569 ||  || — || September 19, 2009 || Catalina || CSS || — || align=right | 3.0 km || 
|-id=570 bgcolor=#E9E9E9
| 414570 ||  || — || September 20, 2009 || Catalina || CSS || — || align=right | 2.7 km || 
|-id=571 bgcolor=#fefefe
| 414571 ||  || — || September 12, 2009 || Kitt Peak || Spacewatch || H || align=right data-sort-value="0.71" | 710 m || 
|-id=572 bgcolor=#d6d6d6
| 414572 ||  || — || September 28, 2009 || Mount Lemmon || Mount Lemmon Survey || — || align=right | 3.1 km || 
|-id=573 bgcolor=#d6d6d6
| 414573 ||  || — || September 22, 2009 || Mount Lemmon || Mount Lemmon Survey || — || align=right | 2.8 km || 
|-id=574 bgcolor=#d6d6d6
| 414574 ||  || — || September 21, 2009 || Mount Lemmon || Mount Lemmon Survey || — || align=right | 2.1 km || 
|-id=575 bgcolor=#d6d6d6
| 414575 ||  || — || September 16, 2009 || Mount Lemmon || Mount Lemmon Survey || — || align=right | 3.0 km || 
|-id=576 bgcolor=#E9E9E9
| 414576 ||  || — || September 20, 2009 || Kitt Peak || Spacewatch || — || align=right | 2.1 km || 
|-id=577 bgcolor=#d6d6d6
| 414577 ||  || — || September 22, 2009 || Mount Lemmon || Mount Lemmon Survey || — || align=right | 3.2 km || 
|-id=578 bgcolor=#d6d6d6
| 414578 ||  || — || December 4, 2005 || Mount Lemmon || Mount Lemmon Survey || KOR || align=right | 1.2 km || 
|-id=579 bgcolor=#d6d6d6
| 414579 ||  || — || September 27, 2009 || Mount Lemmon || Mount Lemmon Survey || — || align=right | 3.4 km || 
|-id=580 bgcolor=#d6d6d6
| 414580 ||  || — || October 23, 2004 || Kitt Peak || Spacewatch || — || align=right | 2.4 km || 
|-id=581 bgcolor=#d6d6d6
| 414581 ||  || — || September 26, 2009 || Kitt Peak || Spacewatch || EOS || align=right | 1.9 km || 
|-id=582 bgcolor=#fefefe
| 414582 ||  || — || October 12, 2009 || La Sagra || OAM Obs. || H || align=right data-sort-value="0.87" | 870 m || 
|-id=583 bgcolor=#d6d6d6
| 414583 ||  || — || September 12, 2009 || Kitt Peak || Spacewatch || — || align=right | 2.3 km || 
|-id=584 bgcolor=#d6d6d6
| 414584 ||  || — || October 11, 2009 || Mount Lemmon || Mount Lemmon Survey || — || align=right | 2.3 km || 
|-id=585 bgcolor=#d6d6d6
| 414585 ||  || — || October 23, 2009 || Tzec Maun || F. Tozzi || Tj (2.97) || align=right | 5.0 km || 
|-id=586 bgcolor=#FFC2E0
| 414586 ||  || — || October 22, 2009 || Socorro || LINEAR || AMO +1km || align=right data-sort-value="1" | 1000 m || 
|-id=587 bgcolor=#d6d6d6
| 414587 ||  || — || October 18, 2009 || Mount Lemmon || Mount Lemmon Survey || EMA || align=right | 5.6 km || 
|-id=588 bgcolor=#E9E9E9
| 414588 ||  || — || October 21, 2009 || Catalina || CSS || — || align=right | 3.2 km || 
|-id=589 bgcolor=#d6d6d6
| 414589 ||  || — || October 8, 2004 || Kitt Peak || Spacewatch || — || align=right | 1.7 km || 
|-id=590 bgcolor=#d6d6d6
| 414590 ||  || — || October 18, 2009 || Mount Lemmon || Mount Lemmon Survey || — || align=right | 2.1 km || 
|-id=591 bgcolor=#d6d6d6
| 414591 ||  || — || October 18, 2009 || Mount Lemmon || Mount Lemmon Survey || — || align=right | 2.3 km || 
|-id=592 bgcolor=#d6d6d6
| 414592 ||  || — || October 22, 2009 || Mount Lemmon || Mount Lemmon Survey || — || align=right | 2.2 km || 
|-id=593 bgcolor=#E9E9E9
| 414593 ||  || — || October 18, 2009 || Mount Lemmon || Mount Lemmon Survey || — || align=right | 1.9 km || 
|-id=594 bgcolor=#d6d6d6
| 414594 ||  || — || October 22, 2009 || Catalina || CSS || — || align=right | 4.6 km || 
|-id=595 bgcolor=#d6d6d6
| 414595 ||  || — || October 23, 2009 || Mount Lemmon || Mount Lemmon Survey || — || align=right | 2.1 km || 
|-id=596 bgcolor=#d6d6d6
| 414596 ||  || — || September 16, 2004 || Kitt Peak || Spacewatch || — || align=right | 1.9 km || 
|-id=597 bgcolor=#d6d6d6
| 414597 ||  || — || October 23, 2009 || Mount Lemmon || Mount Lemmon Survey || KOR || align=right | 1.4 km || 
|-id=598 bgcolor=#d6d6d6
| 414598 ||  || — || April 7, 2006 || Kitt Peak || Spacewatch || — || align=right | 3.3 km || 
|-id=599 bgcolor=#d6d6d6
| 414599 ||  || — || October 26, 2009 || Farra d'Isonzo || Farra d'Isonzo || — || align=right | 3.4 km || 
|-id=600 bgcolor=#d6d6d6
| 414600 ||  || — || September 21, 2009 || Mount Lemmon || Mount Lemmon Survey || — || align=right | 3.3 km || 
|}

414601–414700 

|-bgcolor=#d6d6d6
| 414601 ||  || — || October 24, 2009 || Catalina || CSS || — || align=right | 2.8 km || 
|-id=602 bgcolor=#d6d6d6
| 414602 ||  || — || October 25, 2009 || Kitt Peak || Spacewatch || — || align=right | 2.6 km || 
|-id=603 bgcolor=#d6d6d6
| 414603 ||  || — || September 21, 2009 || Mount Lemmon || Mount Lemmon Survey || — || align=right | 2.2 km || 
|-id=604 bgcolor=#d6d6d6
| 414604 ||  || — || October 21, 2009 || Mount Lemmon || Mount Lemmon Survey || — || align=right | 3.4 km || 
|-id=605 bgcolor=#d6d6d6
| 414605 ||  || — || September 21, 2009 || Mount Lemmon || Mount Lemmon Survey || — || align=right | 2.4 km || 
|-id=606 bgcolor=#d6d6d6
| 414606 ||  || — || October 18, 2009 || Mount Lemmon || Mount Lemmon Survey || — || align=right | 3.8 km || 
|-id=607 bgcolor=#d6d6d6
| 414607 ||  || — || October 23, 2009 || Kitt Peak || Spacewatch || EOS || align=right | 2.0 km || 
|-id=608 bgcolor=#d6d6d6
| 414608 ||  || — || September 20, 2009 || Kitt Peak || Spacewatch || — || align=right | 1.9 km || 
|-id=609 bgcolor=#d6d6d6
| 414609 ||  || — || October 16, 2009 || Catalina || CSS || EUP || align=right | 4.7 km || 
|-id=610 bgcolor=#d6d6d6
| 414610 ||  || — || October 22, 2009 || Mount Lemmon || Mount Lemmon Survey || EOS || align=right | 2.0 km || 
|-id=611 bgcolor=#d6d6d6
| 414611 ||  || — || October 26, 2009 || Kitt Peak || Spacewatch || — || align=right | 3.1 km || 
|-id=612 bgcolor=#d6d6d6
| 414612 ||  || — || October 18, 2009 || Mount Lemmon || Mount Lemmon Survey || — || align=right | 3.1 km || 
|-id=613 bgcolor=#d6d6d6
| 414613 ||  || — || October 23, 2009 || Mount Lemmon || Mount Lemmon Survey || — || align=right | 2.7 km || 
|-id=614 bgcolor=#d6d6d6
| 414614 ||  || — || October 16, 2009 || Catalina || CSS ||  || align=right | 3.4 km || 
|-id=615 bgcolor=#d6d6d6
| 414615 ||  || — || October 16, 2009 || Mount Lemmon || Mount Lemmon Survey || — || align=right | 5.1 km || 
|-id=616 bgcolor=#d6d6d6
| 414616 ||  || — || October 17, 2009 || Mount Lemmon || Mount Lemmon Survey || — || align=right | 3.0 km || 
|-id=617 bgcolor=#d6d6d6
| 414617 ||  || — || October 23, 2009 || Mount Lemmon || Mount Lemmon Survey || — || align=right | 3.4 km || 
|-id=618 bgcolor=#d6d6d6
| 414618 ||  || — || October 18, 2009 || Mount Lemmon || Mount Lemmon Survey || LIX || align=right | 4.2 km || 
|-id=619 bgcolor=#d6d6d6
| 414619 ||  || — || October 17, 2009 || Mount Lemmon || Mount Lemmon Survey || — || align=right | 2.1 km || 
|-id=620 bgcolor=#d6d6d6
| 414620 ||  || — || September 18, 2009 || Mount Lemmon || Mount Lemmon Survey || EOS || align=right | 2.0 km || 
|-id=621 bgcolor=#d6d6d6
| 414621 ||  || — || November 8, 2009 || Catalina || CSS || — || align=right | 3.6 km || 
|-id=622 bgcolor=#d6d6d6
| 414622 ||  || — || October 23, 2009 || Kitt Peak || Spacewatch || — || align=right | 3.1 km || 
|-id=623 bgcolor=#d6d6d6
| 414623 ||  || — || November 8, 2009 || Mount Lemmon || Mount Lemmon Survey || — || align=right | 2.9 km || 
|-id=624 bgcolor=#d6d6d6
| 414624 ||  || — || November 8, 2009 || Mount Lemmon || Mount Lemmon Survey || KOR || align=right | 1.3 km || 
|-id=625 bgcolor=#d6d6d6
| 414625 ||  || — || November 9, 2009 || Kitt Peak || Spacewatch || — || align=right | 2.6 km || 
|-id=626 bgcolor=#d6d6d6
| 414626 ||  || — || November 9, 2009 || Kitt Peak || Spacewatch || — || align=right | 1.9 km || 
|-id=627 bgcolor=#d6d6d6
| 414627 ||  || — || October 23, 2009 || Mount Lemmon || Mount Lemmon Survey || — || align=right | 2.3 km || 
|-id=628 bgcolor=#d6d6d6
| 414628 ||  || — || November 9, 2009 || Mount Lemmon || Mount Lemmon Survey || — || align=right | 3.2 km || 
|-id=629 bgcolor=#d6d6d6
| 414629 ||  || — || May 3, 2008 || Kitt Peak || Spacewatch || — || align=right | 2.7 km || 
|-id=630 bgcolor=#d6d6d6
| 414630 ||  || — || October 18, 2009 || Mount Lemmon || Mount Lemmon Survey || — || align=right | 5.3 km || 
|-id=631 bgcolor=#d6d6d6
| 414631 ||  || — || October 23, 2009 || Kitt Peak || Spacewatch || KOR || align=right | 1.3 km || 
|-id=632 bgcolor=#d6d6d6
| 414632 ||  || — || November 10, 2009 || Mount Lemmon || Mount Lemmon Survey || — || align=right | 3.4 km || 
|-id=633 bgcolor=#d6d6d6
| 414633 ||  || — || November 8, 2009 || Kitt Peak || Spacewatch || — || align=right | 2.8 km || 
|-id=634 bgcolor=#d6d6d6
| 414634 ||  || — || November 8, 2009 || Kitt Peak || Spacewatch || EOS || align=right | 2.0 km || 
|-id=635 bgcolor=#d6d6d6
| 414635 ||  || — || October 21, 2009 || Mount Lemmon || Mount Lemmon Survey || — || align=right | 3.4 km || 
|-id=636 bgcolor=#d6d6d6
| 414636 ||  || — || September 22, 2009 || Mount Lemmon || Mount Lemmon Survey || — || align=right | 2.8 km || 
|-id=637 bgcolor=#d6d6d6
| 414637 ||  || — || September 23, 2009 || Mount Lemmon || Mount Lemmon Survey || EMA || align=right | 3.9 km || 
|-id=638 bgcolor=#d6d6d6
| 414638 ||  || — || October 12, 2009 || Mount Lemmon || Mount Lemmon Survey || EOS || align=right | 2.1 km || 
|-id=639 bgcolor=#d6d6d6
| 414639 ||  || — || November 9, 2009 || Catalina || CSS || — || align=right | 3.8 km || 
|-id=640 bgcolor=#d6d6d6
| 414640 ||  || — || October 21, 2009 || Mount Lemmon || Mount Lemmon Survey || — || align=right | 4.1 km || 
|-id=641 bgcolor=#d6d6d6
| 414641 ||  || — || November 8, 2009 || Kitt Peak || Spacewatch || EOS || align=right | 1.7 km || 
|-id=642 bgcolor=#d6d6d6
| 414642 ||  || — || November 8, 2009 || Kitt Peak || Spacewatch || — || align=right | 3.4 km || 
|-id=643 bgcolor=#d6d6d6
| 414643 ||  || — || November 9, 2009 || Kitt Peak || Spacewatch || — || align=right | 3.0 km || 
|-id=644 bgcolor=#d6d6d6
| 414644 ||  || — || October 26, 2009 || Kitt Peak || Spacewatch || — || align=right | 2.2 km || 
|-id=645 bgcolor=#d6d6d6
| 414645 ||  || — || November 9, 2009 || Kitt Peak || Spacewatch || EOS || align=right | 2.2 km || 
|-id=646 bgcolor=#d6d6d6
| 414646 ||  || — || November 9, 2009 || Kitt Peak || Spacewatch || — || align=right | 3.0 km || 
|-id=647 bgcolor=#d6d6d6
| 414647 ||  || — || November 9, 2009 || Kitt Peak || Spacewatch || — || align=right | 1.9 km || 
|-id=648 bgcolor=#d6d6d6
| 414648 ||  || — || November 9, 2009 || Kitt Peak || Spacewatch || — || align=right | 2.8 km || 
|-id=649 bgcolor=#d6d6d6
| 414649 ||  || — || September 30, 2009 || Mount Lemmon || Mount Lemmon Survey || EOS || align=right | 2.0 km || 
|-id=650 bgcolor=#d6d6d6
| 414650 ||  || — || November 11, 2009 || Catalina || CSS || — || align=right | 3.0 km || 
|-id=651 bgcolor=#d6d6d6
| 414651 ||  || — || September 19, 2009 || Mount Lemmon || Mount Lemmon Survey || — || align=right | 3.0 km || 
|-id=652 bgcolor=#d6d6d6
| 414652 ||  || — || November 9, 2009 || Kitt Peak || Spacewatch || EOS || align=right | 1.8 km || 
|-id=653 bgcolor=#d6d6d6
| 414653 ||  || — || November 8, 2009 || Kitt Peak || Spacewatch || KOR || align=right | 1.5 km || 
|-id=654 bgcolor=#d6d6d6
| 414654 ||  || — || November 8, 2009 || Kitt Peak || Spacewatch || KOR || align=right | 1.4 km || 
|-id=655 bgcolor=#d6d6d6
| 414655 ||  || — || November 19, 2003 || Anderson Mesa || LONEOS || — || align=right | 2.9 km || 
|-id=656 bgcolor=#d6d6d6
| 414656 ||  || — || November 8, 2009 || Mount Lemmon || Mount Lemmon Survey || EOS || align=right | 4.0 km || 
|-id=657 bgcolor=#d6d6d6
| 414657 ||  || — || November 16, 2009 || Mount Lemmon || Mount Lemmon Survey || — || align=right | 3.5 km || 
|-id=658 bgcolor=#d6d6d6
| 414658 ||  || — || November 19, 2009 || Socorro || LINEAR || — || align=right | 2.1 km || 
|-id=659 bgcolor=#d6d6d6
| 414659 ||  || — || November 16, 2009 || Kitt Peak || Spacewatch || — || align=right | 2.9 km || 
|-id=660 bgcolor=#d6d6d6
| 414660 ||  || — || November 16, 2009 || Kitt Peak || Spacewatch || EOS || align=right | 2.1 km || 
|-id=661 bgcolor=#d6d6d6
| 414661 ||  || — || October 26, 2009 || Mount Lemmon || Mount Lemmon Survey || — || align=right | 3.7 km || 
|-id=662 bgcolor=#d6d6d6
| 414662 ||  || — || November 16, 2009 || Kitt Peak || Spacewatch || — || align=right | 4.5 km || 
|-id=663 bgcolor=#d6d6d6
| 414663 ||  || — || November 16, 2009 || Kitt Peak || Spacewatch || THM || align=right | 2.1 km || 
|-id=664 bgcolor=#d6d6d6
| 414664 ||  || — || November 16, 2009 || Mount Lemmon || Mount Lemmon Survey || — || align=right | 2.6 km || 
|-id=665 bgcolor=#d6d6d6
| 414665 ||  || — || October 16, 2009 || Mount Lemmon || Mount Lemmon Survey || — || align=right | 3.9 km || 
|-id=666 bgcolor=#d6d6d6
| 414666 ||  || — || February 24, 2006 || Mount Lemmon || Mount Lemmon Survey || EOS || align=right | 2.1 km || 
|-id=667 bgcolor=#fefefe
| 414667 ||  || — || November 17, 2009 || Kitt Peak || Spacewatch || H || align=right data-sort-value="0.94" | 940 m || 
|-id=668 bgcolor=#d6d6d6
| 414668 ||  || — || October 23, 2009 || Kitt Peak || Spacewatch || — || align=right | 2.5 km || 
|-id=669 bgcolor=#d6d6d6
| 414669 ||  || — || November 18, 2009 || Kitt Peak || Spacewatch || — || align=right | 4.5 km || 
|-id=670 bgcolor=#d6d6d6
| 414670 ||  || — || September 21, 2009 || Mount Lemmon || Mount Lemmon Survey || TIR || align=right | 3.6 km || 
|-id=671 bgcolor=#d6d6d6
| 414671 ||  || — || November 18, 2009 || Kitt Peak || Spacewatch || EOS || align=right | 2.0 km || 
|-id=672 bgcolor=#d6d6d6
| 414672 ||  || — || November 18, 2009 || Kitt Peak || Spacewatch || — || align=right | 3.1 km || 
|-id=673 bgcolor=#d6d6d6
| 414673 ||  || — || November 18, 2009 || Kitt Peak || Spacewatch || — || align=right | 4.5 km || 
|-id=674 bgcolor=#d6d6d6
| 414674 ||  || — || November 19, 2009 || Kitt Peak || Spacewatch || — || align=right | 2.5 km || 
|-id=675 bgcolor=#d6d6d6
| 414675 ||  || — || November 19, 2009 || Kitt Peak || Spacewatch || NAE || align=right | 5.2 km || 
|-id=676 bgcolor=#d6d6d6
| 414676 ||  || — || September 28, 2003 || Kitt Peak || Spacewatch || — || align=right | 2.9 km || 
|-id=677 bgcolor=#d6d6d6
| 414677 ||  || — || April 18, 2007 || Mount Lemmon || Mount Lemmon Survey || — || align=right | 3.1 km || 
|-id=678 bgcolor=#d6d6d6
| 414678 ||  || — || October 26, 2009 || Kitt Peak || Spacewatch || — || align=right | 2.4 km || 
|-id=679 bgcolor=#d6d6d6
| 414679 ||  || — || October 21, 2009 || Mount Lemmon || Mount Lemmon Survey || — || align=right | 3.5 km || 
|-id=680 bgcolor=#d6d6d6
| 414680 ||  || — || November 20, 2009 || Kitt Peak || Spacewatch || — || align=right | 2.8 km || 
|-id=681 bgcolor=#d6d6d6
| 414681 ||  || — || November 20, 2009 || Kitt Peak || Spacewatch || THM || align=right | 2.3 km || 
|-id=682 bgcolor=#d6d6d6
| 414682 ||  || — || November 20, 2009 || Mount Lemmon || Mount Lemmon Survey || — || align=right | 3.7 km || 
|-id=683 bgcolor=#d6d6d6
| 414683 ||  || — || January 17, 2005 || Kitt Peak || Spacewatch || THM || align=right | 2.1 km || 
|-id=684 bgcolor=#d6d6d6
| 414684 ||  || — || September 19, 2003 || Kitt Peak || Spacewatch || THM || align=right | 2.6 km || 
|-id=685 bgcolor=#d6d6d6
| 414685 ||  || — || November 23, 2009 || Mount Lemmon || Mount Lemmon Survey || — || align=right | 2.3 km || 
|-id=686 bgcolor=#d6d6d6
| 414686 ||  || — || November 10, 2009 || Mount Lemmon || Mount Lemmon Survey || — || align=right | 4.2 km || 
|-id=687 bgcolor=#d6d6d6
| 414687 ||  || — || November 18, 2009 || Mount Lemmon || Mount Lemmon Survey || — || align=right | 4.6 km || 
|-id=688 bgcolor=#d6d6d6
| 414688 ||  || — || January 23, 2006 || Kitt Peak || Spacewatch || — || align=right | 2.1 km || 
|-id=689 bgcolor=#d6d6d6
| 414689 ||  || — || November 19, 2009 || Mount Lemmon || Mount Lemmon Survey || — || align=right | 4.5 km || 
|-id=690 bgcolor=#d6d6d6
| 414690 ||  || — || November 19, 2009 || Mount Lemmon || Mount Lemmon Survey || EOS || align=right | 4.0 km || 
|-id=691 bgcolor=#d6d6d6
| 414691 ||  || — || November 9, 2009 || Catalina || CSS || EOS || align=right | 2.3 km || 
|-id=692 bgcolor=#d6d6d6
| 414692 ||  || — || October 16, 2009 || Mount Lemmon || Mount Lemmon Survey || — || align=right | 1.5 km || 
|-id=693 bgcolor=#d6d6d6
| 414693 ||  || — || November 20, 2009 || Mount Lemmon || Mount Lemmon Survey || — || align=right | 4.3 km || 
|-id=694 bgcolor=#d6d6d6
| 414694 ||  || — || September 4, 2008 || Kitt Peak || Spacewatch || — || align=right | 2.3 km || 
|-id=695 bgcolor=#d6d6d6
| 414695 ||  || — || November 9, 2009 || Kitt Peak || Spacewatch || — || align=right | 4.3 km || 
|-id=696 bgcolor=#d6d6d6
| 414696 ||  || — || October 30, 2009 || Mount Lemmon || Mount Lemmon Survey || — || align=right | 2.6 km || 
|-id=697 bgcolor=#d6d6d6
| 414697 ||  || — || November 21, 2009 || Kitt Peak || Spacewatch || — || align=right | 3.2 km || 
|-id=698 bgcolor=#d6d6d6
| 414698 ||  || — || October 1, 2003 || Kitt Peak || Spacewatch || — || align=right | 2.2 km || 
|-id=699 bgcolor=#d6d6d6
| 414699 ||  || — || November 17, 2009 || Kitt Peak || Spacewatch || — || align=right | 3.9 km || 
|-id=700 bgcolor=#d6d6d6
| 414700 ||  || — || November 22, 2009 || Kitt Peak || Spacewatch || EOS || align=right | 2.0 km || 
|}

414701–414800 

|-bgcolor=#d6d6d6
| 414701 ||  || — || November 22, 2009 || Kitt Peak || Spacewatch || — || align=right | 2.7 km || 
|-id=702 bgcolor=#d6d6d6
| 414702 ||  || — || October 17, 2009 || Mount Lemmon || Mount Lemmon Survey || EOS || align=right | 2.3 km || 
|-id=703 bgcolor=#d6d6d6
| 414703 ||  || — || November 22, 2009 || Kitt Peak || Spacewatch || — || align=right | 2.4 km || 
|-id=704 bgcolor=#d6d6d6
| 414704 ||  || — || November 23, 2009 || Kitt Peak || Spacewatch || — || align=right | 4.1 km || 
|-id=705 bgcolor=#d6d6d6
| 414705 ||  || — || November 10, 2009 || Kitt Peak || Spacewatch || HYG || align=right | 2.5 km || 
|-id=706 bgcolor=#d6d6d6
| 414706 ||  || — || November 16, 1998 || Kitt Peak || Spacewatch || — || align=right | 2.0 km || 
|-id=707 bgcolor=#d6d6d6
| 414707 ||  || — || July 27, 2009 || Kitt Peak || Spacewatch || — || align=right | 3.6 km || 
|-id=708 bgcolor=#d6d6d6
| 414708 ||  || — || October 27, 2009 || Kitt Peak || Spacewatch || — || align=right | 3.0 km || 
|-id=709 bgcolor=#d6d6d6
| 414709 ||  || — || November 17, 2009 || Catalina || CSS || — || align=right | 2.3 km || 
|-id=710 bgcolor=#d6d6d6
| 414710 ||  || — || September 16, 2003 || Kitt Peak || Spacewatch || HYG || align=right | 2.4 km || 
|-id=711 bgcolor=#d6d6d6
| 414711 ||  || — || November 20, 2009 || Kitt Peak || Spacewatch || — || align=right | 4.1 km || 
|-id=712 bgcolor=#d6d6d6
| 414712 ||  || — || November 18, 2009 || Kitt Peak || Spacewatch || — || align=right | 3.5 km || 
|-id=713 bgcolor=#E9E9E9
| 414713 ||  || — || November 30, 2000 || Kitt Peak || Spacewatch || — || align=right | 2.8 km || 
|-id=714 bgcolor=#d6d6d6
| 414714 ||  || — || September 15, 1998 || Kitt Peak || Spacewatch || — || align=right | 1.7 km || 
|-id=715 bgcolor=#d6d6d6
| 414715 ||  || — || November 17, 2009 || Mount Lemmon || Mount Lemmon Survey || — || align=right | 1.9 km || 
|-id=716 bgcolor=#d6d6d6
| 414716 ||  || — || November 16, 2009 || Kitt Peak || Spacewatch || — || align=right | 2.6 km || 
|-id=717 bgcolor=#d6d6d6
| 414717 ||  || — || November 17, 2009 || Mount Lemmon || Mount Lemmon Survey || — || align=right | 2.9 km || 
|-id=718 bgcolor=#d6d6d6
| 414718 ||  || — || November 16, 2009 || Kitt Peak || Spacewatch || EMA || align=right | 4.5 km || 
|-id=719 bgcolor=#d6d6d6
| 414719 ||  || — || November 18, 2009 || Kitt Peak || Spacewatch || — || align=right | 8.1 km || 
|-id=720 bgcolor=#d6d6d6
| 414720 ||  || — || November 25, 2009 || Kitt Peak || Spacewatch ||  || align=right | 3.9 km || 
|-id=721 bgcolor=#d6d6d6
| 414721 ||  || — || November 24, 2009 || Kitt Peak || Spacewatch || — || align=right | 4.5 km || 
|-id=722 bgcolor=#d6d6d6
| 414722 ||  || — || December 9, 2009 || La Sagra || OAM Obs. || — || align=right | 2.5 km || 
|-id=723 bgcolor=#d6d6d6
| 414723 ||  || — || December 10, 2009 || Mount Lemmon || Mount Lemmon Survey || — || align=right | 2.2 km || 
|-id=724 bgcolor=#d6d6d6
| 414724 ||  || — || November 9, 2009 || Kitt Peak || Spacewatch || — || align=right | 3.5 km || 
|-id=725 bgcolor=#d6d6d6
| 414725 ||  || — || December 10, 2009 || La Sagra || OAM Obs. || — || align=right | 3.3 km || 
|-id=726 bgcolor=#d6d6d6
| 414726 ||  || — || December 13, 2009 || Mount Lemmon || Mount Lemmon Survey || — || align=right | 2.7 km || 
|-id=727 bgcolor=#d6d6d6
| 414727 ||  || — || December 10, 2009 || Mount Lemmon || Mount Lemmon Survey || THM || align=right | 3.2 km || 
|-id=728 bgcolor=#d6d6d6
| 414728 ||  || — || December 13, 2009 || Catalina || CSS || — || align=right | 3.9 km || 
|-id=729 bgcolor=#d6d6d6
| 414729 ||  || — || December 17, 2009 || Mount Lemmon || Mount Lemmon Survey || EOS || align=right | 1.8 km || 
|-id=730 bgcolor=#d6d6d6
| 414730 ||  || — || December 17, 2009 || Mount Lemmon || Mount Lemmon Survey || — || align=right | 2.8 km || 
|-id=731 bgcolor=#d6d6d6
| 414731 ||  || — || December 26, 2009 || Sierra Stars || Sierra Stars Obs. || — || align=right | 3.6 km || 
|-id=732 bgcolor=#d6d6d6
| 414732 ||  || — || December 17, 2009 || Mount Lemmon || Mount Lemmon Survey || — || align=right | 4.3 km || 
|-id=733 bgcolor=#d6d6d6
| 414733 ||  || — || November 11, 2009 || Mount Lemmon || Mount Lemmon Survey || THM || align=right | 2.0 km || 
|-id=734 bgcolor=#d6d6d6
| 414734 ||  || — || November 21, 2009 || Mount Lemmon || Mount Lemmon Survey || — || align=right | 4.1 km || 
|-id=735 bgcolor=#d6d6d6
| 414735 ||  || — || October 30, 2009 || Mount Lemmon || Mount Lemmon Survey || Tj (2.97) || align=right | 5.2 km || 
|-id=736 bgcolor=#d6d6d6
| 414736 ||  || — || January 11, 2010 || Mount Lemmon || Mount Lemmon Survey || — || align=right | 4.4 km || 
|-id=737 bgcolor=#d6d6d6
| 414737 ||  || — || January 6, 2010 || Catalina || CSS || EUP || align=right | 4.5 km || 
|-id=738 bgcolor=#d6d6d6
| 414738 ||  || — || January 7, 2010 || Mount Lemmon || Mount Lemmon Survey || — || align=right | 1.9 km || 
|-id=739 bgcolor=#d6d6d6
| 414739 ||  || — || January 12, 2010 || Catalina || CSS || LIX || align=right | 4.1 km || 
|-id=740 bgcolor=#d6d6d6
| 414740 ||  || — || November 21, 2009 || Mount Lemmon || Mount Lemmon Survey || — || align=right | 5.4 km || 
|-id=741 bgcolor=#d6d6d6
| 414741 ||  || — || February 12, 2010 || Socorro || LINEAR || — || align=right | 2.4 km || 
|-id=742 bgcolor=#fefefe
| 414742 ||  || — || February 13, 2010 || Catalina || CSS || H || align=right data-sort-value="0.76" | 760 m || 
|-id=743 bgcolor=#d6d6d6
| 414743 ||  || — || November 10, 2009 || Catalina || CSS || — || align=right | 4.5 km || 
|-id=744 bgcolor=#d6d6d6
| 414744 ||  || — || March 3, 2006 || Mount Lemmon || Mount Lemmon Survey || — || align=right | 3.0 km || 
|-id=745 bgcolor=#d6d6d6
| 414745 ||  || — || March 5, 2010 || WISE || WISE || — || align=right | 6.2 km || 
|-id=746 bgcolor=#FFC2E0
| 414746 ||  || — || March 6, 2010 || WISE || WISE || AMO +1kmcritical || align=right | 1.8 km || 
|-id=747 bgcolor=#d6d6d6
| 414747 ||  || — || March 9, 2010 || WISE || WISE || — || align=right | 3.7 km || 
|-id=748 bgcolor=#d6d6d6
| 414748 ||  || — || March 12, 2010 || Kitt Peak || Spacewatch || Tj (2.98) || align=right | 4.0 km || 
|-id=749 bgcolor=#fefefe
| 414749 ||  || — || March 19, 2010 || Kitt Peak || Spacewatch || H || align=right data-sort-value="0.98" | 980 m || 
|-id=750 bgcolor=#fefefe
| 414750 ||  || — || March 30, 2010 || WISE || WISE || — || align=right | 1.4 km || 
|-id=751 bgcolor=#FA8072
| 414751 ||  || — || April 7, 2007 || Mount Lemmon || Mount Lemmon Survey || — || align=right data-sort-value="0.52" | 520 m || 
|-id=752 bgcolor=#d6d6d6
| 414752 ||  || — || December 15, 2009 || Mount Lemmon || Mount Lemmon Survey || — || align=right | 5.4 km || 
|-id=753 bgcolor=#fefefe
| 414753 ||  || — || April 6, 2010 || Kitt Peak || Spacewatch || — || align=right data-sort-value="0.83" | 830 m || 
|-id=754 bgcolor=#d6d6d6
| 414754 ||  || — || December 20, 2009 || Catalina || CSS || — || align=right | 3.9 km || 
|-id=755 bgcolor=#fefefe
| 414755 ||  || — || April 14, 2010 || WISE || WISE || — || align=right | 2.0 km || 
|-id=756 bgcolor=#fefefe
| 414756 ||  || — || August 22, 1995 || Kitt Peak || Spacewatch || — || align=right data-sort-value="0.56" | 560 m || 
|-id=757 bgcolor=#fefefe
| 414757 ||  || — || October 7, 2004 || Kitt Peak || Spacewatch || — || align=right data-sort-value="0.59" | 590 m || 
|-id=758 bgcolor=#fefefe
| 414758 ||  || — || April 10, 2010 || Kitt Peak || Spacewatch || — || align=right data-sort-value="0.58" | 580 m || 
|-id=759 bgcolor=#fefefe
| 414759 ||  || — || May 3, 2010 || Kitt Peak || Spacewatch || — || align=right data-sort-value="0.77" | 770 m || 
|-id=760 bgcolor=#fefefe
| 414760 ||  || — || August 9, 2004 || Anderson Mesa || LONEOS || — || align=right data-sort-value="0.75" | 750 m || 
|-id=761 bgcolor=#fefefe
| 414761 ||  || — || April 26, 2000 || Kitt Peak || Spacewatch || (883) || align=right data-sort-value="0.61" | 610 m || 
|-id=762 bgcolor=#fefefe
| 414762 ||  || — || May 29, 2010 || WISE || WISE || — || align=right | 2.1 km || 
|-id=763 bgcolor=#fefefe
| 414763 ||  || — || November 19, 2000 || Socorro || LINEAR || — || align=right | 2.8 km || 
|-id=764 bgcolor=#fefefe
| 414764 ||  || — || June 1, 2010 || Kitt Peak || Spacewatch || — || align=right | 2.1 km || 
|-id=765 bgcolor=#E9E9E9
| 414765 ||  || — || August 29, 2006 || Anderson Mesa || LONEOS || — || align=right | 1.7 km || 
|-id=766 bgcolor=#d6d6d6
| 414766 ||  || — || June 18, 2010 || Westfield || ARO || — || align=right | 3.2 km || 
|-id=767 bgcolor=#fefefe
| 414767 ||  || — || June 19, 2010 || WISE || WISE || — || align=right | 1.2 km || 
|-id=768 bgcolor=#fefefe
| 414768 ||  || — || November 28, 1999 || Kitt Peak || Spacewatch || — || align=right | 1.5 km || 
|-id=769 bgcolor=#fefefe
| 414769 ||  || — || July 6, 2010 || WISE || WISE || — || align=right | 1.6 km || 
|-id=770 bgcolor=#E9E9E9
| 414770 ||  || — || July 20, 2010 || WISE || WISE || — || align=right | 2.6 km || 
|-id=771 bgcolor=#E9E9E9
| 414771 ||  || — || October 27, 2006 || Catalina || CSS || — || align=right | 1.9 km || 
|-id=772 bgcolor=#FFC2E0
| 414772 ||  || — || July 28, 2010 || WISE || WISE || APO || align=right | 1.5 km || 
|-id=773 bgcolor=#E9E9E9
| 414773 ||  || — || November 10, 2006 || Kitt Peak || Spacewatch || — || align=right | 1.3 km || 
|-id=774 bgcolor=#fefefe
| 414774 ||  || — || August 6, 2010 || Antares || A. Singh, S. Wadhwa || — || align=right data-sort-value="0.71" | 710 m || 
|-id=775 bgcolor=#E9E9E9
| 414775 ||  || — || August 8, 2010 || WISE || WISE || — || align=right | 2.3 km || 
|-id=776 bgcolor=#fefefe
| 414776 ||  || — || November 5, 2007 || Kitt Peak || Spacewatch || — || align=right data-sort-value="0.88" | 880 m || 
|-id=777 bgcolor=#fefefe
| 414777 ||  || — || June 19, 2010 || Kitt Peak || Spacewatch || V || align=right data-sort-value="0.78" | 780 m || 
|-id=778 bgcolor=#fefefe
| 414778 ||  || — || August 10, 2010 || Kitt Peak || Spacewatch || — || align=right data-sort-value="0.93" | 930 m || 
|-id=779 bgcolor=#fefefe
| 414779 ||  || — || June 19, 2010 || Mount Lemmon || Mount Lemmon Survey || — || align=right data-sort-value="0.69" | 690 m || 
|-id=780 bgcolor=#fefefe
| 414780 ||  || — || August 10, 2010 || XuYi || PMO NEO || NYS || align=right data-sort-value="0.68" | 680 m || 
|-id=781 bgcolor=#fefefe
| 414781 ||  || — || October 4, 1999 || Kitt Peak || Spacewatch || NYS || align=right data-sort-value="0.61" | 610 m || 
|-id=782 bgcolor=#fefefe
| 414782 ||  || — || July 20, 1999 || Kitt Peak || Spacewatch || — || align=right data-sort-value="0.74" | 740 m || 
|-id=783 bgcolor=#fefefe
| 414783 ||  || — || August 20, 2010 || La Sagra || OAM Obs. || — || align=right data-sort-value="0.73" | 730 m || 
|-id=784 bgcolor=#fefefe
| 414784 ||  || — || September 3, 2010 || Socorro || LINEAR || V || align=right data-sort-value="0.77" | 770 m || 
|-id=785 bgcolor=#fefefe
| 414785 ||  || — || September 3, 2010 || Socorro || LINEAR || — || align=right | 1.0 km || 
|-id=786 bgcolor=#fefefe
| 414786 ||  || — || December 27, 1999 || Kitt Peak || Spacewatch || — || align=right data-sort-value="0.80" | 800 m || 
|-id=787 bgcolor=#fefefe
| 414787 ||  || — || March 2, 2005 || Kitt Peak || Spacewatch || — || align=right data-sort-value="0.96" | 960 m || 
|-id=788 bgcolor=#fefefe
| 414788 ||  || — || September 6, 2010 || Kitt Peak || Spacewatch || — || align=right data-sort-value="0.99" | 990 m || 
|-id=789 bgcolor=#fefefe
| 414789 ||  || — || August 28, 2006 || Catalina || CSS || — || align=right data-sort-value="0.73" | 730 m || 
|-id=790 bgcolor=#fefefe
| 414790 ||  || — || September 10, 2010 || Kitt Peak || Spacewatch || V || align=right data-sort-value="0.71" | 710 m || 
|-id=791 bgcolor=#fefefe
| 414791 ||  || — || September 12, 2010 || Kitt Peak || Spacewatch || — || align=right data-sort-value="0.81" | 810 m || 
|-id=792 bgcolor=#fefefe
| 414792 ||  || — || February 2, 2008 || Kitt Peak || Spacewatch || MAS || align=right data-sort-value="0.82" | 820 m || 
|-id=793 bgcolor=#E9E9E9
| 414793 ||  || — || March 6, 2008 || Mount Lemmon || Mount Lemmon Survey || BAR || align=right | 1.2 km || 
|-id=794 bgcolor=#fefefe
| 414794 ||  || — || August 21, 2006 || Kitt Peak || Spacewatch || — || align=right data-sort-value="0.68" | 680 m || 
|-id=795 bgcolor=#fefefe
| 414795 ||  || — || February 26, 2009 || Mount Lemmon || Mount Lemmon Survey || — || align=right data-sort-value="0.79" | 790 m || 
|-id=796 bgcolor=#fefefe
| 414796 ||  || — || August 12, 2010 || Kitt Peak || Spacewatch || — || align=right data-sort-value="0.77" | 770 m || 
|-id=797 bgcolor=#E9E9E9
| 414797 ||  || — || September 5, 2010 || Mount Lemmon || Mount Lemmon Survey || — || align=right | 1.5 km || 
|-id=798 bgcolor=#fefefe
| 414798 ||  || — || November 19, 2003 || Kitt Peak || Spacewatch || — || align=right | 1.0 km || 
|-id=799 bgcolor=#fefefe
| 414799 ||  || — || December 14, 2007 || Mount Lemmon || Mount Lemmon Survey || — || align=right | 1.2 km || 
|-id=800 bgcolor=#FFC2E0
| 414800 ||  || — || September 17, 2010 || Catalina || CSS || APOcritical || align=right data-sort-value="0.25" | 250 m || 
|}

414801–414900 

|-bgcolor=#E9E9E9
| 414801 ||  || — || September 25, 2006 || Kitt Peak || Spacewatch || — || align=right data-sort-value="0.71" | 710 m || 
|-id=802 bgcolor=#fefefe
| 414802 ||  || — || March 12, 2008 || Kitt Peak || Spacewatch || — || align=right data-sort-value="0.74" | 740 m || 
|-id=803 bgcolor=#fefefe
| 414803 ||  || — || November 19, 2003 || Kitt Peak || Spacewatch || MAS || align=right data-sort-value="0.56" | 560 m || 
|-id=804 bgcolor=#fefefe
| 414804 ||  || — || January 18, 2008 || Kitt Peak || Spacewatch || — || align=right data-sort-value="0.85" | 850 m || 
|-id=805 bgcolor=#fefefe
| 414805 ||  || — || September 25, 2006 || Mount Lemmon || Mount Lemmon Survey || — || align=right data-sort-value="0.76" | 760 m || 
|-id=806 bgcolor=#fefefe
| 414806 ||  || — || October 16, 1999 || Kitt Peak || Spacewatch || — || align=right data-sort-value="0.60" | 600 m || 
|-id=807 bgcolor=#E9E9E9
| 414807 ||  || — || October 3, 2010 || Kitt Peak || Spacewatch || — || align=right | 1.5 km || 
|-id=808 bgcolor=#fefefe
| 414808 ||  || — || September 8, 2010 || Kitt Peak || Spacewatch || — || align=right | 1.2 km || 
|-id=809 bgcolor=#fefefe
| 414809 ||  || — || December 5, 2007 || Kitt Peak || Spacewatch || NYS || align=right data-sort-value="0.67" | 670 m || 
|-id=810 bgcolor=#fefefe
| 414810 ||  || — || March 3, 2009 || Kitt Peak || Spacewatch || — || align=right data-sort-value="0.78" | 780 m || 
|-id=811 bgcolor=#E9E9E9
| 414811 ||  || — || October 2, 2010 || Kitt Peak || Spacewatch || RAF || align=right data-sort-value="0.88" | 880 m || 
|-id=812 bgcolor=#E9E9E9
| 414812 ||  || — || March 8, 2008 || Kitt Peak || Spacewatch || EUN || align=right | 1.6 km || 
|-id=813 bgcolor=#E9E9E9
| 414813 ||  || — || September 19, 2006 || Kitt Peak || Spacewatch || — || align=right | 1.0 km || 
|-id=814 bgcolor=#E9E9E9
| 414814 ||  || — || October 3, 2006 || Mount Lemmon || Mount Lemmon Survey || KON || align=right | 1.6 km || 
|-id=815 bgcolor=#fefefe
| 414815 ||  || — || September 30, 2006 || Catalina || CSS || — || align=right data-sort-value="0.91" | 910 m || 
|-id=816 bgcolor=#fefefe
| 414816 ||  || — || December 16, 2007 || Mount Lemmon || Mount Lemmon Survey || — || align=right | 2.1 km || 
|-id=817 bgcolor=#E9E9E9
| 414817 ||  || — || December 17, 2006 || Catalina || CSS || JUN || align=right | 1.0 km || 
|-id=818 bgcolor=#E9E9E9
| 414818 ||  || — || October 19, 2010 || Mount Lemmon || Mount Lemmon Survey || — || align=right | 2.0 km || 
|-id=819 bgcolor=#E9E9E9
| 414819 ||  || — || April 4, 2008 || Kitt Peak || Spacewatch || — || align=right | 1.2 km || 
|-id=820 bgcolor=#E9E9E9
| 414820 ||  || — || October 28, 2010 || Kitt Peak || Spacewatch || EUN || align=right | 1.3 km || 
|-id=821 bgcolor=#E9E9E9
| 414821 ||  || — || March 29, 2008 || Kitt Peak || Spacewatch || — || align=right | 1.4 km || 
|-id=822 bgcolor=#E9E9E9
| 414822 ||  || — || November 17, 2006 || Kitt Peak || Spacewatch || (5) || align=right data-sort-value="0.72" | 720 m || 
|-id=823 bgcolor=#E9E9E9
| 414823 ||  || — || March 1, 2008 || Mount Lemmon || Mount Lemmon Survey || — || align=right | 1.9 km || 
|-id=824 bgcolor=#E9E9E9
| 414824 ||  || — || December 14, 2006 || Kitt Peak || Spacewatch || — || align=right | 1.4 km || 
|-id=825 bgcolor=#E9E9E9
| 414825 ||  || — || October 13, 2010 || Catalina || CSS || — || align=right | 1.1 km || 
|-id=826 bgcolor=#E9E9E9
| 414826 ||  || — || September 30, 2006 || Mount Lemmon || Mount Lemmon Survey || EUN || align=right | 1.1 km || 
|-id=827 bgcolor=#E9E9E9
| 414827 ||  || — || September 17, 2010 || Mount Lemmon || Mount Lemmon Survey || EUN || align=right data-sort-value="0.93" | 930 m || 
|-id=828 bgcolor=#E9E9E9
| 414828 ||  || — || March 5, 2008 || Mount Lemmon || Mount Lemmon Survey || — || align=right | 1.3 km || 
|-id=829 bgcolor=#E9E9E9
| 414829 ||  || — || October 29, 2010 || Kitt Peak || Spacewatch || — || align=right | 2.0 km || 
|-id=830 bgcolor=#E9E9E9
| 414830 ||  || — || December 15, 2006 || Kitt Peak || Spacewatch || — || align=right | 1.2 km || 
|-id=831 bgcolor=#E9E9E9
| 414831 ||  || — || November 17, 2006 || Kitt Peak || Spacewatch || (5) || align=right data-sort-value="0.65" | 650 m || 
|-id=832 bgcolor=#E9E9E9
| 414832 ||  || — || October 30, 2010 || Catalina || CSS || — || align=right | 1.2 km || 
|-id=833 bgcolor=#E9E9E9
| 414833 ||  || — || October 30, 2010 || Kitt Peak || Spacewatch || (5) || align=right | 1.1 km || 
|-id=834 bgcolor=#E9E9E9
| 414834 ||  || — || October 30, 2010 || Kitt Peak || Spacewatch || — || align=right data-sort-value="0.96" | 960 m || 
|-id=835 bgcolor=#E9E9E9
| 414835 ||  || — || November 15, 2006 || Kitt Peak || Spacewatch || — || align=right | 1.0 km || 
|-id=836 bgcolor=#E9E9E9
| 414836 ||  || — || March 20, 2004 || Kitt Peak || Spacewatch || — || align=right | 1.1 km || 
|-id=837 bgcolor=#E9E9E9
| 414837 ||  || — || December 10, 2006 || Kitt Peak || Spacewatch || — || align=right | 1.9 km || 
|-id=838 bgcolor=#E9E9E9
| 414838 ||  || — || October 28, 2010 || Kitt Peak || Spacewatch || ADE || align=right | 2.0 km || 
|-id=839 bgcolor=#fefefe
| 414839 ||  || — || March 4, 2005 || Mount Lemmon || Mount Lemmon Survey || MAS || align=right data-sort-value="0.84" | 840 m || 
|-id=840 bgcolor=#E9E9E9
| 414840 ||  || — || February 13, 2008 || Kitt Peak || Spacewatch || — || align=right | 1.9 km || 
|-id=841 bgcolor=#E9E9E9
| 414841 ||  || — || February 28, 2008 || Kitt Peak || Spacewatch || — || align=right | 1.5 km || 
|-id=842 bgcolor=#E9E9E9
| 414842 ||  || — || November 1, 2010 || Kitt Peak || Spacewatch || — || align=right | 1.3 km || 
|-id=843 bgcolor=#E9E9E9
| 414843 ||  || — || October 19, 2010 || Mount Lemmon || Mount Lemmon Survey || — || align=right | 2.1 km || 
|-id=844 bgcolor=#E9E9E9
| 414844 ||  || — || September 11, 2010 || Mount Lemmon || Mount Lemmon Survey || — || align=right | 1.6 km || 
|-id=845 bgcolor=#E9E9E9
| 414845 ||  || — || November 21, 2006 || Mount Lemmon || Mount Lemmon Survey || KON || align=right | 2.0 km || 
|-id=846 bgcolor=#E9E9E9
| 414846 ||  || — || November 2, 2010 || Kitt Peak || Spacewatch || — || align=right | 1.1 km || 
|-id=847 bgcolor=#E9E9E9
| 414847 ||  || — || October 30, 2010 || Catalina || CSS || ADE || align=right | 2.1 km || 
|-id=848 bgcolor=#E9E9E9
| 414848 ||  || — || November 3, 2010 || Mount Lemmon || Mount Lemmon Survey || — || align=right | 1.6 km || 
|-id=849 bgcolor=#E9E9E9
| 414849 ||  || — || October 7, 2005 || Kitt Peak || Spacewatch || — || align=right | 2.0 km || 
|-id=850 bgcolor=#E9E9E9
| 414850 ||  || — || October 28, 2010 || Mount Lemmon || Mount Lemmon Survey || — || align=right | 3.0 km || 
|-id=851 bgcolor=#E9E9E9
| 414851 ||  || — || September 18, 1993 || Kitt Peak || Spacewatch || — || align=right data-sort-value="0.88" | 880 m || 
|-id=852 bgcolor=#E9E9E9
| 414852 ||  || — || August 10, 2010 || Kitt Peak || Spacewatch || — || align=right | 1.5 km || 
|-id=853 bgcolor=#E9E9E9
| 414853 ||  || — || November 18, 2006 || Kitt Peak || Spacewatch || — || align=right data-sort-value="0.91" | 910 m || 
|-id=854 bgcolor=#E9E9E9
| 414854 ||  || — || November 22, 2006 || Kitt Peak || Spacewatch || KON || align=right | 2.8 km || 
|-id=855 bgcolor=#E9E9E9
| 414855 ||  || — || November 23, 2006 || Kitt Peak || Spacewatch || — || align=right | 1.2 km || 
|-id=856 bgcolor=#E9E9E9
| 414856 ||  || — || May 5, 2008 || Mount Lemmon || Mount Lemmon Survey || — || align=right | 1.6 km || 
|-id=857 bgcolor=#E9E9E9
| 414857 ||  || — || December 13, 2006 || Mount Lemmon || Mount Lemmon Survey || — || align=right | 1.2 km || 
|-id=858 bgcolor=#E9E9E9
| 414858 ||  || — || October 28, 2010 || Kitt Peak || Spacewatch || — || align=right | 1.1 km || 
|-id=859 bgcolor=#E9E9E9
| 414859 ||  || — || January 8, 2007 || Kitt Peak || Spacewatch || — || align=right | 1.3 km || 
|-id=860 bgcolor=#E9E9E9
| 414860 ||  || — || October 14, 2001 || Socorro || LINEAR || — || align=right | 2.0 km || 
|-id=861 bgcolor=#E9E9E9
| 414861 ||  || — || February 10, 2008 || Kitt Peak || Spacewatch || — || align=right data-sort-value="0.91" | 910 m || 
|-id=862 bgcolor=#E9E9E9
| 414862 ||  || — || March 10, 2008 || Kitt Peak || Spacewatch || — || align=right | 1.4 km || 
|-id=863 bgcolor=#E9E9E9
| 414863 ||  || — || November 16, 2006 || Mount Lemmon || Mount Lemmon Survey || — || align=right | 1.2 km || 
|-id=864 bgcolor=#E9E9E9
| 414864 ||  || — || September 11, 2010 || Mount Lemmon || Mount Lemmon Survey || — || align=right data-sort-value="0.86" | 860 m || 
|-id=865 bgcolor=#E9E9E9
| 414865 ||  || — || November 7, 2010 || Socorro || LINEAR || — || align=right | 1.1 km || 
|-id=866 bgcolor=#E9E9E9
| 414866 ||  || — || August 29, 2005 || Kitt Peak || Spacewatch || — || align=right | 1.8 km || 
|-id=867 bgcolor=#E9E9E9
| 414867 ||  || — || December 13, 2006 || Kitt Peak || Spacewatch || — || align=right | 2.1 km || 
|-id=868 bgcolor=#E9E9E9
| 414868 ||  || — || November 11, 2006 || Kitt Peak || Spacewatch || EUN || align=right | 1.2 km || 
|-id=869 bgcolor=#E9E9E9
| 414869 ||  || — || October 23, 2006 || Mount Lemmon || Mount Lemmon Survey || — || align=right | 1.1 km || 
|-id=870 bgcolor=#E9E9E9
| 414870 ||  || — || October 30, 2010 || Kitt Peak || Spacewatch || EUN || align=right | 1.5 km || 
|-id=871 bgcolor=#E9E9E9
| 414871 ||  || — || April 5, 2008 || Mount Lemmon || Mount Lemmon Survey || — || align=right | 1.8 km || 
|-id=872 bgcolor=#E9E9E9
| 414872 ||  || — || November 10, 2010 || Mount Lemmon || Mount Lemmon Survey || — || align=right | 1.9 km || 
|-id=873 bgcolor=#E9E9E9
| 414873 ||  || — || March 27, 2008 || Kitt Peak || Spacewatch || — || align=right | 1.2 km || 
|-id=874 bgcolor=#E9E9E9
| 414874 ||  || — || November 22, 2006 || Mount Lemmon || Mount Lemmon Survey || — || align=right | 1.4 km || 
|-id=875 bgcolor=#E9E9E9
| 414875 ||  || — || November 23, 2006 || Kitt Peak || Spacewatch || — || align=right data-sort-value="0.89" | 890 m || 
|-id=876 bgcolor=#E9E9E9
| 414876 ||  || — || October 19, 2006 || Mount Lemmon || Mount Lemmon Survey || — || align=right data-sort-value="0.98" | 980 m || 
|-id=877 bgcolor=#E9E9E9
| 414877 ||  || — || September 28, 2006 || Mount Lemmon || Mount Lemmon Survey || (5) || align=right data-sort-value="0.83" | 830 m || 
|-id=878 bgcolor=#E9E9E9
| 414878 ||  || — || November 13, 2010 || Mount Lemmon || Mount Lemmon Survey || — || align=right | 1.7 km || 
|-id=879 bgcolor=#E9E9E9
| 414879 ||  || — || October 17, 2010 || Mount Lemmon || Mount Lemmon Survey || — || align=right | 1.5 km || 
|-id=880 bgcolor=#E9E9E9
| 414880 ||  || — || March 31, 2008 || Mount Lemmon || Mount Lemmon Survey || — || align=right | 1.5 km || 
|-id=881 bgcolor=#E9E9E9
| 414881 ||  || — || December 6, 1997 || Caussols || ODAS || ADE || align=right | 2.1 km || 
|-id=882 bgcolor=#E9E9E9
| 414882 ||  || — || October 17, 2010 || Mount Lemmon || Mount Lemmon Survey || (5) || align=right data-sort-value="0.68" | 680 m || 
|-id=883 bgcolor=#E9E9E9
| 414883 ||  || — || November 27, 2010 || Mount Lemmon || Mount Lemmon Survey || — || align=right | 1.9 km || 
|-id=884 bgcolor=#E9E9E9
| 414884 ||  || — || November 1, 2010 || Kitt Peak || Spacewatch || — || align=right | 1.2 km || 
|-id=885 bgcolor=#E9E9E9
| 414885 ||  || — || August 31, 2005 || Kitt Peak || Spacewatch || — || align=right | 1.5 km || 
|-id=886 bgcolor=#E9E9E9
| 414886 ||  || — || November 27, 2010 || Mount Lemmon || Mount Lemmon Survey || — || align=right | 1.3 km || 
|-id=887 bgcolor=#E9E9E9
| 414887 ||  || — || December 11, 2006 || Kitt Peak || Spacewatch || — || align=right | 1.6 km || 
|-id=888 bgcolor=#E9E9E9
| 414888 ||  || — || November 8, 2010 || Kitt Peak || Spacewatch || — || align=right | 1.1 km || 
|-id=889 bgcolor=#E9E9E9
| 414889 ||  || — || October 27, 2006 || Mount Lemmon || Mount Lemmon Survey || — || align=right | 1.2 km || 
|-id=890 bgcolor=#E9E9E9
| 414890 ||  || — || November 1, 2006 || Mount Lemmon || Mount Lemmon Survey || — || align=right | 1.9 km || 
|-id=891 bgcolor=#E9E9E9
| 414891 ||  || — || February 9, 2007 || Catalina || CSS || — || align=right | 1.3 km || 
|-id=892 bgcolor=#E9E9E9
| 414892 ||  || — || April 28, 2004 || Kitt Peak || Spacewatch || — || align=right data-sort-value="0.92" | 920 m || 
|-id=893 bgcolor=#E9E9E9
| 414893 ||  || — || May 14, 2008 || Mount Lemmon || Mount Lemmon Survey || NEM || align=right | 2.1 km || 
|-id=894 bgcolor=#E9E9E9
| 414894 ||  || — || December 14, 2006 || Kitt Peak || Spacewatch || MAR || align=right | 1.4 km || 
|-id=895 bgcolor=#E9E9E9
| 414895 ||  || — || November 25, 2006 || Mount Lemmon || Mount Lemmon Survey || — || align=right | 1.5 km || 
|-id=896 bgcolor=#E9E9E9
| 414896 ||  || — || March 31, 2008 || Kitt Peak || Spacewatch || — || align=right | 1.2 km || 
|-id=897 bgcolor=#E9E9E9
| 414897 ||  || — || December 13, 2006 || Kitt Peak || Spacewatch || — || align=right | 1.3 km || 
|-id=898 bgcolor=#fefefe
| 414898 ||  || — || December 17, 2006 || Mount Lemmon || Mount Lemmon Survey || — || align=right data-sort-value="0.91" | 910 m || 
|-id=899 bgcolor=#E9E9E9
| 414899 ||  || — || October 30, 2005 || Mount Lemmon || Mount Lemmon Survey || — || align=right | 2.0 km || 
|-id=900 bgcolor=#E9E9E9
| 414900 ||  || — || September 4, 2010 || Kitt Peak || Spacewatch || — || align=right | 1.5 km || 
|}

414901–415000 

|-bgcolor=#E9E9E9
| 414901 ||  || — || November 25, 2006 || Mount Lemmon || Mount Lemmon Survey || — || align=right | 1.0 km || 
|-id=902 bgcolor=#E9E9E9
| 414902 ||  || — || April 25, 2003 || Kitt Peak || Spacewatch || HOF || align=right | 2.7 km || 
|-id=903 bgcolor=#FFC2E0
| 414903 ||  || — || August 10, 2010 || Kitt Peak || Spacewatch || AMO +1km || align=right | 1.1 km || 
|-id=904 bgcolor=#E9E9E9
| 414904 ||  || — || December 21, 2006 || Kitt Peak || Spacewatch || WIT || align=right data-sort-value="0.93" | 930 m || 
|-id=905 bgcolor=#E9E9E9
| 414905 ||  || — || November 6, 2010 || Mount Lemmon || Mount Lemmon Survey || WIT || align=right | 1.1 km || 
|-id=906 bgcolor=#E9E9E9
| 414906 ||  || — || January 28, 2007 || Mount Lemmon || Mount Lemmon Survey || — || align=right | 1.8 km || 
|-id=907 bgcolor=#E9E9E9
| 414907 ||  || — || August 24, 2001 || Anderson Mesa || LONEOS || — || align=right | 1.8 km || 
|-id=908 bgcolor=#E9E9E9
| 414908 ||  || — || December 21, 2006 || Mount Lemmon || Mount Lemmon Survey || — || align=right | 1.3 km || 
|-id=909 bgcolor=#E9E9E9
| 414909 ||  || — || December 12, 2006 || Kitt Peak || Spacewatch || — || align=right | 1.5 km || 
|-id=910 bgcolor=#E9E9E9
| 414910 ||  || — || December 2, 2010 || Mount Lemmon || Mount Lemmon Survey || (5) || align=right data-sort-value="0.79" | 790 m || 
|-id=911 bgcolor=#E9E9E9
| 414911 ||  || — || February 23, 2007 || Kitt Peak || Spacewatch || — || align=right | 1.2 km || 
|-id=912 bgcolor=#E9E9E9
| 414912 ||  || — || August 18, 2009 || Kitt Peak || Spacewatch || — || align=right | 2.0 km || 
|-id=913 bgcolor=#E9E9E9
| 414913 ||  || — || December 14, 2010 || Mount Lemmon || Mount Lemmon Survey || — || align=right data-sort-value="0.92" | 920 m || 
|-id=914 bgcolor=#E9E9E9
| 414914 ||  || — || February 25, 2007 || Mount Lemmon || Mount Lemmon Survey || — || align=right | 1.4 km || 
|-id=915 bgcolor=#E9E9E9
| 414915 ||  || — || November 1, 2005 || Mount Lemmon || Mount Lemmon Survey || — || align=right | 2.7 km || 
|-id=916 bgcolor=#E9E9E9
| 414916 ||  || — || December 6, 2010 || Mount Lemmon || Mount Lemmon Survey || — || align=right | 2.1 km || 
|-id=917 bgcolor=#d6d6d6
| 414917 ||  || — || December 30, 2005 || Socorro || LINEAR || — || align=right | 2.3 km || 
|-id=918 bgcolor=#d6d6d6
| 414918 ||  || — || December 5, 2010 || Mount Lemmon || Mount Lemmon Survey || — || align=right | 2.3 km || 
|-id=919 bgcolor=#E9E9E9
| 414919 ||  || — || November 7, 2010 || Mount Lemmon || Mount Lemmon Survey || — || align=right | 3.0 km || 
|-id=920 bgcolor=#E9E9E9
| 414920 ||  || — || November 1, 2005 || Mount Lemmon || Mount Lemmon Survey || — || align=right | 2.2 km || 
|-id=921 bgcolor=#E9E9E9
| 414921 ||  || — || March 13, 2007 || Catalina || CSS || — || align=right | 1.6 km || 
|-id=922 bgcolor=#d6d6d6
| 414922 ||  || — || June 19, 2007 || Kitt Peak || Spacewatch || EOS || align=right | 2.0 km || 
|-id=923 bgcolor=#d6d6d6
| 414923 ||  || — || December 5, 2010 || Mount Lemmon || Mount Lemmon Survey || EOS || align=right | 2.2 km || 
|-id=924 bgcolor=#d6d6d6
| 414924 ||  || — || October 15, 2009 || Catalina || CSS || EOS || align=right | 2.6 km || 
|-id=925 bgcolor=#E9E9E9
| 414925 ||  || — || January 10, 2011 || Kitt Peak || Spacewatch || — || align=right | 3.5 km || 
|-id=926 bgcolor=#E9E9E9
| 414926 ||  || — || November 25, 2005 || Catalina || CSS || — || align=right | 2.5 km || 
|-id=927 bgcolor=#d6d6d6
| 414927 ||  || — || March 21, 2002 || Kitt Peak || Spacewatch || — || align=right | 4.1 km || 
|-id=928 bgcolor=#E9E9E9
| 414928 ||  || — || October 24, 2005 || Kitt Peak || Spacewatch || — || align=right | 1.8 km || 
|-id=929 bgcolor=#d6d6d6
| 414929 ||  || — || October 26, 2009 || Kitt Peak || Spacewatch || — || align=right | 3.3 km || 
|-id=930 bgcolor=#d6d6d6
| 414930 ||  || — || January 11, 2011 || Kitt Peak || Spacewatch || — || align=right | 4.2 km || 
|-id=931 bgcolor=#d6d6d6
| 414931 ||  || — || December 10, 2010 || Mount Lemmon || Mount Lemmon Survey || EOS || align=right | 2.4 km || 
|-id=932 bgcolor=#d6d6d6
| 414932 ||  || — || January 13, 2000 || Kitt Peak || Spacewatch || EOS || align=right | 2.5 km || 
|-id=933 bgcolor=#d6d6d6
| 414933 ||  || — || October 4, 2004 || Kitt Peak || Spacewatch || — || align=right | 2.1 km || 
|-id=934 bgcolor=#d6d6d6
| 414934 ||  || — || January 7, 2006 || Kitt Peak || Spacewatch || EOS || align=right | 1.6 km || 
|-id=935 bgcolor=#E9E9E9
| 414935 ||  || — || December 8, 2005 || Catalina || CSS || — || align=right | 2.7 km || 
|-id=936 bgcolor=#E9E9E9
| 414936 ||  || — || December 2, 2005 || Socorro || LINEAR || — || align=right | 2.1 km || 
|-id=937 bgcolor=#E9E9E9
| 414937 ||  || — || January 7, 2011 || Kitt Peak || Spacewatch || HOF || align=right | 2.3 km || 
|-id=938 bgcolor=#E9E9E9
| 414938 ||  || — || October 24, 2005 || Kitt Peak || Spacewatch || — || align=right | 1.7 km || 
|-id=939 bgcolor=#E9E9E9
| 414939 ||  || — || January 2, 2011 || Catalina || CSS || — || align=right | 2.6 km || 
|-id=940 bgcolor=#E9E9E9
| 414940 ||  || — || January 25, 2011 || Kitt Peak || Spacewatch || (5) || align=right | 1.0 km || 
|-id=941 bgcolor=#d6d6d6
| 414941 ||  || — || September 5, 2008 || Kitt Peak || Spacewatch || — || align=right | 3.4 km || 
|-id=942 bgcolor=#d6d6d6
| 414942 ||  || — || December 11, 2004 || Kitt Peak || Spacewatch || — || align=right | 3.0 km || 
|-id=943 bgcolor=#d6d6d6
| 414943 ||  || — || January 12, 2011 || Kitt Peak || Spacewatch || EOS || align=right | 2.2 km || 
|-id=944 bgcolor=#d6d6d6
| 414944 ||  || — || December 25, 2005 || Kitt Peak || Spacewatch || — || align=right | 2.2 km || 
|-id=945 bgcolor=#E9E9E9
| 414945 ||  || — || November 29, 2005 || Kitt Peak || Spacewatch || — || align=right | 2.2 km || 
|-id=946 bgcolor=#E9E9E9
| 414946 ||  || — || December 28, 2005 || Kitt Peak || Spacewatch || DOR || align=right | 2.4 km || 
|-id=947 bgcolor=#E9E9E9
| 414947 ||  || — || November 25, 2005 || Catalina || CSS || — || align=right | 2.2 km || 
|-id=948 bgcolor=#d6d6d6
| 414948 ||  || — || January 27, 2011 || Kitt Peak || Spacewatch || — || align=right | 3.0 km || 
|-id=949 bgcolor=#E9E9E9
| 414949 ||  || — || April 11, 2007 || Mount Lemmon || Mount Lemmon Survey || — || align=right | 2.2 km || 
|-id=950 bgcolor=#d6d6d6
| 414950 ||  || — || January 27, 2011 || Kitt Peak || Spacewatch || EOS || align=right | 1.9 km || 
|-id=951 bgcolor=#d6d6d6
| 414951 ||  || — || January 10, 2011 || Mount Lemmon || Mount Lemmon Survey || — || align=right | 3.5 km || 
|-id=952 bgcolor=#d6d6d6
| 414952 ||  || — || February 8, 2000 || Kitt Peak || Spacewatch || — || align=right | 2.5 km || 
|-id=953 bgcolor=#E9E9E9
| 414953 ||  || — || December 8, 2005 || Kitt Peak || Spacewatch || — || align=right | 2.2 km || 
|-id=954 bgcolor=#E9E9E9
| 414954 ||  || — || January 20, 2002 || Kitt Peak || Spacewatch || — || align=right | 1.7 km || 
|-id=955 bgcolor=#E9E9E9
| 414955 ||  || — || October 5, 2005 || Catalina || CSS || — || align=right | 1.5 km || 
|-id=956 bgcolor=#d6d6d6
| 414956 ||  || — || January 31, 2006 || Kitt Peak || Spacewatch || — || align=right | 5.0 km || 
|-id=957 bgcolor=#E9E9E9
| 414957 ||  || — || December 25, 2005 || Kitt Peak || Spacewatch || — || align=right | 2.4 km || 
|-id=958 bgcolor=#E9E9E9
| 414958 ||  || — || December 25, 2005 || Kitt Peak || Spacewatch || — || align=right | 2.0 km || 
|-id=959 bgcolor=#d6d6d6
| 414959 ||  || — || February 22, 2006 || Kitt Peak || Spacewatch || — || align=right | 3.7 km || 
|-id=960 bgcolor=#FFC2E0
| 414960 ||  || — || January 16, 2011 || Mount Lemmon || Mount Lemmon Survey || AMO || align=right data-sort-value="0.36" | 360 m || 
|-id=961 bgcolor=#d6d6d6
| 414961 ||  || — || May 16, 2007 || Mount Lemmon || Mount Lemmon Survey || — || align=right | 3.0 km || 
|-id=962 bgcolor=#E9E9E9
| 414962 ||  || — || August 22, 2004 || Kitt Peak || Spacewatch || — || align=right | 2.5 km || 
|-id=963 bgcolor=#d6d6d6
| 414963 ||  || — || December 9, 2010 || Mount Lemmon || Mount Lemmon Survey || — || align=right | 3.3 km || 
|-id=964 bgcolor=#d6d6d6
| 414964 ||  || — || January 10, 2006 || Mount Lemmon || Mount Lemmon Survey || EOS || align=right | 2.0 km || 
|-id=965 bgcolor=#d6d6d6
| 414965 ||  || — || September 16, 2009 || Kitt Peak || Spacewatch || — || align=right | 2.2 km || 
|-id=966 bgcolor=#d6d6d6
| 414966 ||  || — || November 19, 2009 || Kitt Peak || Spacewatch || — || align=right | 3.0 km || 
|-id=967 bgcolor=#E9E9E9
| 414967 ||  || — || December 29, 2005 || Socorro || LINEAR || — || align=right | 2.4 km || 
|-id=968 bgcolor=#d6d6d6
| 414968 ||  || — || March 3, 2006 || Kitt Peak || Spacewatch || — || align=right | 2.4 km || 
|-id=969 bgcolor=#d6d6d6
| 414969 ||  || — || September 30, 2009 || Mount Lemmon || Mount Lemmon Survey || — || align=right | 3.2 km || 
|-id=970 bgcolor=#E9E9E9
| 414970 ||  || — || September 26, 2005 || Kitt Peak || Spacewatch || — || align=right | 1.4 km || 
|-id=971 bgcolor=#d6d6d6
| 414971 ||  || — || September 22, 2009 || Mount Lemmon || Mount Lemmon Survey || — || align=right | 2.4 km || 
|-id=972 bgcolor=#d6d6d6
| 414972 ||  || — || September 4, 2008 || Kitt Peak || Spacewatch || — || align=right | 2.6 km || 
|-id=973 bgcolor=#d6d6d6
| 414973 ||  || — || January 26, 2006 || Mount Lemmon || Mount Lemmon Survey || — || align=right | 2.6 km || 
|-id=974 bgcolor=#d6d6d6
| 414974 ||  || — || August 24, 2008 || Kitt Peak || Spacewatch || — || align=right | 2.8 km || 
|-id=975 bgcolor=#d6d6d6
| 414975 ||  || — || September 30, 2003 || Kitt Peak || Spacewatch || — || align=right | 2.4 km || 
|-id=976 bgcolor=#d6d6d6
| 414976 ||  || — || August 21, 2008 || Kitt Peak || Spacewatch || — || align=right | 3.4 km || 
|-id=977 bgcolor=#E9E9E9
| 414977 ||  || — || December 14, 2010 || Mount Lemmon || Mount Lemmon Survey || — || align=right | 1.8 km || 
|-id=978 bgcolor=#d6d6d6
| 414978 ||  || — || February 25, 2006 || Mount Lemmon || Mount Lemmon Survey || — || align=right | 2.6 km || 
|-id=979 bgcolor=#d6d6d6
| 414979 ||  || — || October 30, 2009 || Mount Lemmon || Mount Lemmon Survey || — || align=right | 3.2 km || 
|-id=980 bgcolor=#E9E9E9
| 414980 ||  || — || January 6, 2002 || Kitt Peak || Spacewatch || — || align=right | 2.0 km || 
|-id=981 bgcolor=#d6d6d6
| 414981 ||  || — || April 19, 2006 || Kitt Peak || Spacewatch || — || align=right | 2.4 km || 
|-id=982 bgcolor=#d6d6d6
| 414982 ||  || — || October 2, 2008 || Kitt Peak || Spacewatch || — || align=right | 3.0 km || 
|-id=983 bgcolor=#d6d6d6
| 414983 ||  || — || September 7, 2008 || Mount Lemmon || Mount Lemmon Survey || — || align=right | 3.3 km || 
|-id=984 bgcolor=#d6d6d6
| 414984 ||  || — || September 6, 2008 || Mount Lemmon || Mount Lemmon Survey || — || align=right | 3.1 km || 
|-id=985 bgcolor=#d6d6d6
| 414985 ||  || — || April 5, 2000 || Socorro || LINEAR || — || align=right | 4.5 km || 
|-id=986 bgcolor=#d6d6d6
| 414986 ||  || — || November 11, 2009 || Kitt Peak || Spacewatch || — || align=right | 3.8 km || 
|-id=987 bgcolor=#d6d6d6
| 414987 ||  || — || January 8, 2011 || Mount Lemmon || Mount Lemmon Survey || EOS || align=right | 2.3 km || 
|-id=988 bgcolor=#d6d6d6
| 414988 ||  || — || September 30, 2009 || Mount Lemmon || Mount Lemmon Survey || — || align=right | 2.5 km || 
|-id=989 bgcolor=#d6d6d6
| 414989 ||  || — || March 2, 2005 || Kitt Peak || Spacewatch || — || align=right | 3.5 km || 
|-id=990 bgcolor=#FFC2E0
| 414990 ||  || — || March 10, 2011 || Kitt Peak || Spacewatch || APOPHA || align=right data-sort-value="0.15" | 150 m || 
|-id=991 bgcolor=#d6d6d6
| 414991 ||  || — || September 7, 2008 || Mount Lemmon || Mount Lemmon Survey || EUP || align=right | 3.7 km || 
|-id=992 bgcolor=#d6d6d6
| 414992 ||  || — || November 4, 2004 || Kitt Peak || Spacewatch || — || align=right | 2.5 km || 
|-id=993 bgcolor=#FA8072
| 414993 ||  || — || September 1, 2005 || Kitt Peak || Spacewatch || — || align=right | 1.7 km || 
|-id=994 bgcolor=#d6d6d6
| 414994 ||  || — || December 8, 2004 || Socorro || LINEAR || — || align=right | 3.0 km || 
|-id=995 bgcolor=#d6d6d6
| 414995 ||  || — || April 30, 2006 || Kitt Peak || Spacewatch || — || align=right | 2.7 km || 
|-id=996 bgcolor=#d6d6d6
| 414996 ||  || — || February 26, 2000 || Kitt Peak || Spacewatch || — || align=right | 3.7 km || 
|-id=997 bgcolor=#d6d6d6
| 414997 ||  || — || April 5, 2000 || Socorro || LINEAR || — || align=right | 3.5 km || 
|-id=998 bgcolor=#d6d6d6
| 414998 ||  || — || January 16, 2000 || Kitt Peak || Spacewatch || — || align=right | 2.1 km || 
|-id=999 bgcolor=#d6d6d6
| 414999 ||  || — || December 16, 2004 || Kitt Peak || Spacewatch || — || align=right | 2.7 km || 
|-id=000 bgcolor=#d6d6d6
| 415000 ||  || — || February 23, 2011 || Kitt Peak || Spacewatch || — || align=right | 3.3 km || 
|}

References

External links 
 Discovery Circumstances: Numbered Minor Planets (410001)–(415000) (IAU Minor Planet Center)

0414